Ezra Weston Loomis Pound (30 October 1885 – 1 November 1972) was an expatriate American poet and critic, a major figure in the early modernist poetry movement, and a fascist collaborator in Italy during World War II. His works include Ripostes (1912), Hugh Selwyn Mauberley (1920), and his 800-page epic poem, The Cantos (c. 1917–1962).

Pound's contribution to poetry began in the early 20th century with his role in developing Imagism, a movement stressing precision and economy of language. Working in London as foreign editor of several American literary magazines, he helped discover and shape the work of contemporaries such as T. S. Eliot, Ernest Hemingway, and James Joyce. He was responsible for the 1914 serialization of Joyce's A Portrait of the Artist as a Young Man, the 1915 publication of Eliot's "The Love Song of J. Alfred Prufrock", and the serialization from 1918 of Joyce's Ulysses. Hemingway wrote in 1932 that, for poets born in the late 19th or early 20th century, not to be influenced by Pound would be "like passing through a great blizzard and not feeling its cold."

Angered by the carnage of World War I, Pound blamed the war on finance capitalism, which he called "usury". He moved to Italy in 1924 and through the 1930s and 1940s promoted an economic theory known as social credit, wrote for publications owned by the British fascist Sir Oswald Mosley, embraced Benito Mussolini's fascism, and expressed support for Adolf Hitler. During World War II and the Holocaust in Italy, he made hundreds of paid radio broadcasts for the Italian government, including in German-occupied Italy, attacking the United States, Franklin D. Roosevelt, Great Britain, international finance, munitions makers and mongers, and Jews, among others, as causes, abettors and prolongers of the world war, as a result of which he was arrested in 1945 by American forces in Italy on charges of treason. He spent months in a U.S. military camp in Pisa, including three weeks in an outdoor steel cage. Deemed unfit to stand trial, he was incarcerated in St. Elizabeths psychiatric hospital in Washington, D.C., for over 12 years.

While in custody in Italy, Pound began work on sections of The Cantos, which were published as The Pisan Cantos (1948), for which he was awarded the Bollingen Prize for Poetry in 1949 by the Library of Congress, causing enormous controversy. After a campaign by his fellow writers, he was released from St. Elizabeths in 1958 and lived in Italy until his death in 1972. His economic and political views have ensured that his life and work remain controversial.

Early life and education (1885–1908)

Family background

Pound was born in 1885 in a two-story clapboard house in Hailey, Idaho Territory, the only child of Homer Loomis Pound (1858–1942) and Isabel Weston (1860–1948), who married in 1884. Homer had worked in Hailey since 1883 as registrar of the General Land Office. Pound's grandfather, Thaddeus Coleman Pound, a Republican Congressman and the 10th Lieutenant Governor of Wisconsin, had secured him the appointment. Homer had previously worked for Thaddeus in the lumber business.

Both sides of Pound's family emigrated from England in the 17th century. On his father's side, the immigrant ancestor was John Pound, a Quaker who arrived from England around 1650. Ezra's paternal grandmother, Susan Angevine Loomis, married Thaddeus Coleman Pound. On his mother's side, Pound was descended from William Wadsworth, a Puritan who emigrated to Boston on the Lion in 1632. Captain Joseph Wadsworth helped to write the first Connecticut constitution. The Wadsworths married into the Westons of New York; Harding Weston and Mary Parker were Pound's maternal grandparents. After serving in the military, Harding remained unemployed, so his brother Ezra Weston and Ezra's wife, Frances Amelia Wessells Freer (Aunt Frank), helped to look after Isabel, Pound's mother.

Early education

Isabel Pound was unhappy in Hailey and took Ezra with her to New York in 1887 when he was 18 months old. Her husband followed and found a job as an assayer at the Philadelphia Mint. After a move to 417 Walnut Street in Jenkintown, Pennsylvania, the family bought a six-bedroom house in 1893 at 166 Fernbrook Avenue, Wyncote. Pound's education began in dame schools: Miss Elliott's school in Jenkintown in 1892 and the Heathcock family's Chelten Hills School in Wyncote in 1893. Known as "Ra" (pronounced "Ray"), he attended Wyncote Public School from September 1894. His first publication was on 7 November 1896 in the Jenkintown Times-Chronicle ("by E. L. Pound, Wyncote, aged 11 years"), a limerick about William Jennings Bryan, who had just lost the 1896 presidential election.

In 1897, aged 12, he transferred to Cheltenham Military Academy (CMA), where he wore an American Civil War-style uniform and was taught drilling and how to shoot. The following year he made his first trip overseas, a three-month tour with his mother and Aunt Frank, who took him to England, Belgium, Germany, Switzerland, Italy, Spain, and Morocco. He attended CMA until 1900, at times as a boarder, but it seems he did not graduate.

University

In 1901 Pound was admitted, aged 15, to the University of Pennsylvania's College of Liberal Arts. Years later he said his aim was to avoid drill at the military academy. His one distinction in first year was in geometry, but otherwise his grades were mostly poor, including in Latin, his major; he achieved a B in English composition and a pass in English literature. In his second year he switched from the degree course to "non-degree special student status", he said "to avoid irrelevant subjects". He was not elected to a fraternity at Penn, but it seemed not to bother him.

His parents and Aunt Frank took him on another three-month European tour in 1902, and the following year he transferred to Hamilton College in Clinton, New York, possibly because of his grades. Again he was not invited to join a fraternity, but this time he had hoped to do so, according to letters home, because he wanted to live in a fraternity house, and by April 1904 he regarded the move as a mistake. Signed up for the Latin–Scientific course, he appears to have avoided some classes; his transcript is short of credits. He studied the Provençal dialect and read Dante and Anglo-Saxon poetry, including Beowulf and The Seafarer.

After graduating from Hamilton in 1905 with a PhB, he returned to Penn, where he fell in love with Hilda Doolittle, then at Bryn Mawr College, and hand-bound 25 of his poems for her, calling it Hilda's Book. (Doolittle became a poet herself, renamed H.D. by Pound.) After receiving his MA in Romance languages in 1906, he registered to write a PhD thesis on the jesters in Lope de Vega's plays; a two-year Harrison fellowship covered his tuition and a $500 grant, with which he sailed again to Europe. He spent three weeks in Madrid in various libraries, including in the Royal Library. On 31 May 1906 he was standing outside the palace during the attempted assassination of King Alfonso and left the city for fear of being mistaken for an anarchist. After Spain he visited Paris and London, returning to the United States in July 1906. His first essay, "Raphaelite Latin", was published in the Book News Monthly that September. He took courses in English in 1907, where he fell out with just about everyone, including the department head, Felix Schelling, with silly remarks during lectures and by winding an enormous tin watch very slowly while Schelling spoke. In the spring of 1907 he learned that his fellowship would not be renewed. Schelling told him he was wasting everyone's time, and he left without finishing his doctorate.

Teaching

From September 1907 Pound taught French and Spanish at Wabash College, a Presbyterian college with 345 students in Crawfordsville, Indiana, which he called "the sixth circle of hell". One former student remembered him as a breath of fresh air; another said he was "exhibitionist, egotistic, self-centered and self-indulgent".

He was dismissed after a few months. Smoking was forbidden, but he would smoke cigarillos in his room in the same corridor as the president's office. He was asked to leave the college in January 1908 when his landladies, Ida and Belle Hall, found a woman in his room. Shocked at having been fired, he left for Europe soon after, sailing from New York in March on the RMS Slavonia.

London (1908–1914)

A Lume Spento
Pound arrived in Gibraltar on 23 March 1908, where he earned $15 a day working as a guide for an American family there and in Spain. After stops in Seville, Grenada, and Genoa, by the end of April he was in Venice, living over a bakery near the San Vio bridge. In the summer he decided to self-publish his first collection of 44 poems in the 72-page A Lume Spento ("With Tapers Quenched"), 150 copies of which were printed in July 1908. The title is from the third canto of Dante's Purgatorio, alluding to the death of Manfred, King of Sicily. Pound dedicated the book to the Philadelphia artist William Brooke Smith, a friend from university who had recently died of tuberculosis.

In "Canto LXXVI"  of The Pisan Cantos, he records that he considered throwing the proofs into the Grand Canal, abandoning the book and poetry altogether: "by the soap-smooth stone posts where San Vio / meets with il Canal Grande / between Salviati and the house that was of Don Carlos / shd/I chuck the lot into the tide-water? / le bozze "A Lume Spento"/ / and by the column of Todero / shd/I shift to the other side / or wait 24 hours".

Move to London

In August 1908 Pound moved to London, carrying 60 copies of A Lume Spento. English poets such as Maurice Hewlett, Rudyard Kipling, and Alfred Tennyson had made a particular kind of Victorian verse—stirring, pompous, and propagandistic—popular. According to modernist scholar James Knapp, Pound rejected the idea of poetry as "versified moral essay"; he wanted to focus on the individual experience, the concrete rather than the abstract.

Pound at first stayed in a boarding house at 8 Duchess Street, near the British Museum Reading Room; he had met the landlady during his travels in Europe in 1906. He soon moved to Islington (cheaper at 12s 6d a week board and lodging), but his father sent him £4 and he was able to move back into central London, to 48 Langham Street, near Great Titchfield Street. The house sat across an alley from the Yorkshire Grey pub, which made an appearance in "Canto LXXX" (The Pisan Cantos), "concerning the landlady's doings / with a lodger unnamed / az waz near Gt Tichfield St. next door to the pub".

Pound persuaded the bookseller Elkin Mathews on Vigo Street to display A Lume Spento, and in an unsigned article on 26 November 1908, Pound reviewed it himself in the Evening Standard: "The unseizable magic of poetry is in this queer paper book; and words are no good in describing it." The following month he self-published a second collection, A Quinzaine for this Yule. It was his first book to have commercial success, and Elkin Matthews had another 100 copies printed. In January and February 1909, after the death of John Churton Collins left a vacancy, Pound lectured for an hour a week in the evenings on "The Development of Literature in Southern Europe" at the Regent Street Polytechnic. Mornings might be spent in the British Museum Reading Room, followed by lunch at the Vienna Café on Oxford Street, where Pound first met Wyndham Lewis in 1910. "There were mysterious figures / that emerged from recondite recesses / and ate at the WIENER CAFÉ". Ford Madox Ford described Pound as "approach[ing] with the step of a dancer, making passes with a cane at an imaginary opponent":

He would wear trousers made of green billiard cloth, a pink coat, a blue shirt, a tie hand-painted by a Japanese friend, an immense sombrero, a flaming beard cut to a point, and a single, large blue earring."

Meeting Dorothy Shakespear, Personae

At a literary salon in 1909, Pound met the novelist Olivia Shakespear and later at the Shakespears' home at 12 Brunswick Gardens, Kensington, was introduced to her daughter, Dorothy, who became Pound's wife in 1914. The critic Iris Barry described her as "carrying herself delicately with the air, always, of a young Victorian lady out skating, and a profile as clear and lovely as that of a porcelain Kuan-yin". "Listen to it—Ezra! Ezra!—And a third time—Ezra!", Dorothy wrote in her diary on 16 February 1909.

Pound mixed with the cream of London's literary circle, including Maurice Hewlett, Laurence Binyon, Frederic Manning, Ernest Rhys, May Sinclair, Ellen Terry, George Bernard Shaw, Hilaire Belloc, T. E. Hulme, and F. S. Flint. Through the Shakespears, he was introduced to the poet W. B. Yeats, Olivia Shakespear's former lover. He had already sent Yeats a copy of A Lume Spento, and Yeats had apparently found it "charming". Pound wrote to William Carlos Williams on 3 February 1909: "Am by way of falling into the crowd that does things here. London, deah old Lundon, is the place for poesy." According to Richard Aldington, London found Pound amusing. The newspapers interviewed him, and he was mentioned in Punch magazine, which on 23 June 1909 described "Mr. Ezekiel Ton" as "the most remarkable thing in poetry since Robert Browning ... [blending] the imagery of the unfettered West, the vocabulary of Wardour Street, and the sinister abandon of Borgiac Italy".

In April 1909 Elkin Mathews published Personae of Ezra Pound (half the poems were from A Lume Spento) and in October a further 27 poems (16 new) as Exultations. Edward Thomas described Personae in English Review as "full of human passion and natural magic". Rupert Brooke complained in the Cambridge Review that Pound had fallen under the influence of Walt Whitman, writing in "unmetrical sprawling lengths that, in his hands, have nothing to commend them". But he did acknowledge that Pound had "great talents".

In or around September, Pound moved into new rooms at Church Walk, off Kensington High Street, where he lived most of the time until 1914. He visited a friend, Walter Rummel, in Paris in March 1910 and was introduced to the American heiress and pianist Margaret Lanier Cravens. Although they had only just met, she offered to become a patron to the tune of $1,000 a year, and from then until her death in 1912 she apparently sent him money regularly.

The Spirit of Romance, Canzoni, the New Age
In June 1910 Pound returned for eight months to the United States; his arrival coincided with the publication in London of his first book of literary criticism, The Spirit of Romance, based on his lecture notes from the polytechnic. Patria Mia, his essays on the United States, were written at this time. In August he moved to New York, renting rooms on Waverly Place and Park Avenue South, facing Gramercy Square. Although he loved New York, he felt alienated by the commercialism and newcomers from Eastern and Southern Europe who were displacing the white Anglo-Saxon Protestants. The recently built New York Public Library Main Branch he found especially offensive. It was during this period that his antisemitism became apparent; he referred in Patria Mia to the  "detestable qualities" of Jews. After persuading his parents to finance his passage back to Europe, he sailed from New York on the R.M.S. Mauretania on 22 February 1911. It was nearly 30 years—April 1939—before he visited the U.S. again.

After three days in London he went to Paris, where he worked on a new collection of poetry, Canzoni (1911), panned by the Westminster Gazette as "affectation combined with pedantry". He wrote in Ford Madox Ford's obituary that Ford had rolled on the floor with laughter at its "stilted language". When he returned to London in August, he rented a room in Marylebone at 2A Granville Place, then shared a house at 39 Addison Road North, W11. By November A. R. Orage, editor of the socialist journal the New Age, had hired him to write a weekly column. Orage appears in The Cantos (Possum is T. S. Eliot): "but the lot of 'em, Yeats, Possum and Wyndham / had no ground beneath 'em. / Orage had."

Pound contributed to the New Age from 30 November 1911 to 13 January 1921, attending editorial meetings in the basement of a grimy ABC tearoom in Chancery Lane. There and at other meetings he met Arnold Bennett, Cecil Chesterton, Beatrice Hastings, S. G. Hobson, T. E. Hulme, Katherine Mansfield, and H. G. Wells. In the New Age office in 1918, he also met C. H. Douglas, a British engineer who was developing his economic theory of social credit, which Pound found attractive. Douglas reportedly believed that Jews were a problem and needed to abandon a Messianic view of themselves as the "dominating race". According to Colin Holmes, the New Age itself published antisemitic material. It was within this environment, not in Italy, according to Tim Redman, that Pound first encountered antisemitic ideas about "usury". "In Douglas's program," Christopher Hitchens wrote in 2008, "Pound had found his true muse: a blend of folkloric Celtic twilight with a paranoid hatred of the money economy and a dire suspicion about an ancient faith."

Poetry magazine, Ripostes, Imagism

Hilda Doolittle arrived in London from Philadelphia in May 1911 with the poet Frances Gregg and Gregg's mother; when they returned in September, Doolittle stayed on. Pound introduced her to his friends, including Richard Aldington, who became her husband in 1913. Before that, the three of them lived in Church Walk, Kensington—Pound at no. 10, Aldington at no. 8, and Doolittle at no. 6—and worked daily in the British Museum Reading Room.

At the British Museum, Laurence Binyon introduced Pound to the East Asian artistic and literary concepts Pound used in his later poetry, including Japanese ukiyo-e prints. The visitors' book first shows Pound in the Prints and Drawings Students' Room (known as the Print Room) on 9 February 1909, and later in 1912 and 1913, with Dorothy Shakespear, examining Chinese and Japanese art. Pound was working at the time on the poems that became Ripostes (1912), trying to move away from his earlier work. "I hadn't in 1910 made a language," he wrote years later. "I don't mean a language to use, but even a language to think in."

In August 1912 Harriet Monroe hired Pound as foreign correspondent of Poetry: A Magazine of Verse, a new magazine in Chicago. The first edition, in October, featured two of his own poems, "To Whistler, American" and "Middle Aged". Also that month Stephen Swift and Co. in London published Ripostes of Ezra Pound, a collection of 25 poems, including a contentious translation of the 8th-century Old English poem The Seafarer, that demonstrate his shift toward minimalist language. In addition to Pound's work, the collection contains five poems by T. E. Hulme.

Ripostes includes the first mention of Les Imagistes: "As for the future, Les Imagistes, the descendants of the forgotten school of 1909, have that in their keeping." While in the British Museum tearoom one afternoon with Doolittle and Aldington, Pound edited one of Doolittle's poems and wrote "H.D. Imagiste" underneath; he described this later as the founding of a movement in poetry, Imagisme. In the spring or early summer of 1912, they agreed, Pound wrote in 1918, on three principles:

1. Direct treatment of the "thing" whether subjective or objective.

2. To use absolutely no word that does not contribute to the presentation.

3. As regarding rhythm: to compose in the sequence of the musical phrase, not in sequence of a metronome.

Poetry published Pound's "A Few Don'ts by an Imagist" in March 1913. Superfluous words, particularly adjectives, should be avoided, as well as expressions like "dim lands of peace". He wrote: "It dulls the image. It mixes an abstraction with the concrete. It comes from the writer's not realizing that the natural object is always the adequate symbol." Poets should "go in fear of abstractions". He wanted Imagisme "to stand for hard light, clear edges", he wrote later to Amy Lowell.

An example of Imagist poetry is Pound's "In a Station of the Metro", published in Poetry in April 1913 and inspired by an experience on the Paris Underground. "I got out of a train at, I think, La Concorde," he wrote in "How I began" in T. P.'s Weekly on 6 June 1913, "and in the jostle I saw a beautiful face, and then, turning suddenly, another and another, and then a beautiful child's face, and then another beautiful face. All that day I tried to find words for what this made me feel. ... I could get nothing but spots of colour." A year later he reduced it to its essence in the style of a Japanese haiku.

James Joyce, Pound's unpopularity

In the summer of 1913 Pound became literary editor of The Egoist, a journal founded by the suffragette Dora Marsden. At the suggestion of W. B. Yeats, Pound encouraged James Joyce in December of that year to submit his work. The previous month Yeats, whose eyesight was failing, had rented Stone Cottage in Coleman's Hatch, Sussex, inviting Pound to accompany him as his secretary, and it was during this visit that Yeats introduced Pound to Joyce's Chamber Music and his "I hear an Army Charging Upon the Land". This was the first of three winters Pound and Yeats spent at Stone Cottage, including two with Dorothy after she and Ezra married in 1914. "Canto LXXXIII" records a visit: "so that I recalled the noise in the chimney / as it were the wind in the chimney / but was in reality Uncle William / downstairs composing / that had made a great Peeeeacock / in the proide ov his oiye."

In his reply to Pound, Joyce gave permission to use "I hear an Army" and enclosed Dubliners and the first chapter of his novel A Portrait of the Artist as a Young Man. Pound wrote to Joyce that the novel was "damn fine stuff". Harriet Shaw Weaver accepted it for The Egoist, which serialized it from 2 February 1914, despite the printers objecting to words like "fart" and "ballocks", and fearing prosecution over Stephen Dedalus's thoughts about prostitutes. On the basis of the serialization, the publisher that had rejected Dubliners reconsidered. Joyce wrote to Yeats: "I can never thank you enough for having brought me into relation with your friend Ezra Pound who is indeed a miracle worker."

Around this time, Pound's articles in the New Age began to make him unpopular, to the alarm of Orage. Samuel Putnam knew Pound in Paris in the 1920s and described him as stubborn, contrary, cantankerous, bossy, touchy, and "devoid of humor"; he was "an American small-towner", in Putnam's view. His attitude caused him trouble in both London and Paris. English women, with their "preponderantly derivative" minds, were inferior to American women who had minds of their own, he wrote in the New Age. The English sense of what was right was based on respect for property, not morality. "[P]erched on the rotten shell of a crumbling empire", London had lost its energy. England's best authors—Conrad, Hudson, James, and Yeats—were not English. English writers and critics were ignorant, he wrote in 1913.

Marriage
Ezra and Dorothy were married on 20 April 1914 at St Mary Abbots in Kensington, the Shakespears' parish church, despite opposition from her parents, who worried about Ezra's income. His concession to marry in church had helped. Dorothy's annual income was £50, with another £150 from her family, and Ezra's was £200. Her father, Henry Hope Shakespear, had him prepare a financial statement in 1911, which showed that his main source of income was his father. After the wedding the couple moved into an apartment with no bathroom at 5 Holland Place Chambers, Kensington, next door to the newly wed H.D. and Aldington. This arrangement did not last. H.D. had been alarmed to find Ezra looking for a place to live outside the apartment building the day before his wedding. Once Dorothy and Ezra had moved into the building, Ezra would arrive unannounced at H.D.'s to discuss his writing, a habit that upset her, in part because his writing touched on private aspects of their relationship. She and Aldington decided to move several miles away to Hampstead.

Des Imagistes, dispute with Amy Lowell

The appearance of Des Imagistes, An Anthology (1914), edited by Pound, "confirmed the importance" of Imagisme, according to Ira Nadel. Published in the American magazine The Glebe in February 1914 and the following month as a book, it was the first of five Imagist anthologies and the only one to contain work by Pound. It included ten poems by Richard Aldington, seven by H. D., followed by F. S. Flint, Skipwith Cannell, Amy Lowell, William Carlos Williams, James Joyce ("I Hear an Army", not an example of Imagism), six by Pound, then Ford Madox Hueffer (as he was known as the time), Allen Upward and John Cournos.

Shortly after its publication, an advertisement for Wyndham Lewis's new magazine, Blast promised it would cover "Cubism, Futurism, Imagisme and all Vital Forms of Modern Art"; in the end, Blast was published only twice, in 1914 and 1915. Pound extended Imagisme to art, naming it Vorticism. In June 1914 The Times announced Lewis's new Rebel Arts Centre for Vorticist art at 38 Great Ormond Street.

The New England poet Amy Lowell, who was to win the Pulitzer Prize for Poetry in 1926, was apparently unhappy that only one of her poems had appeared in Des Imagistes. She arrived in London in July 1914 to attend two dinners at the Dieudonné restaurant in Ryder Street, the first to celebrate the publication of Blast and the second, on 17 July, the publication of Des Imagistes. At the second, Ford Madox Hueffer announced that he had been an Imagiste long before Lowell and Pound, and that he doubted their qualifications; only Aldington and H.D. could lay claim to the title, in his view. During the subsequent row, Pound left the table and returned with a tin bathtub on his head, suggesting it as a symbol of what he called Les Nagistes, a school created by Lowell's poem "In a Garden", which ends with "Night, and the water, and you in your whiteness, bathing!" Apparently his behavior helped Lowell win people over to her point of view, as did her offer to fund future work.

H.D. and Aldington were moving away from Pound's understanding of Imagisme anyway, as he aligned himself with Lewis's ideas. Lowell agreed to finance an annual anthology of Imagiste poets, but she insisted on democracy; according to Aldington, she "proposed a Boston Tea Party for Ezra" and an end to his despotic rule. Upset at Lowell, Pound began to call Imagisme "Amygism"; he declared the movement dead and asked the group not to call themselves Imagistes. Not accepting that it was Pound's invention, they refused and Anglicized the term.

World War I and leaving England (1914–1921)

Meeting Eliot, Cathay, translation

When war was declared in August 1914, opportunities for writers were immediately reduced; poems were now expected to be patriotic. Pound's income from October 1914 to October 1915 was £42.10.0, apparently five times less than the year before.

On 22 September 1914 T. S. Eliot traveled from Merton College, Oxford, with an introduction from Conrad Aiken, to have Pound read Eliot's unpublished "The Love Song of J. Alfred Prufrock". Pound wrote to Harriet Monroe, editor of Poetry, on 30 September to say that Eliot—who was at Oxford on a fellowship from Harvard—had "sent in the best poem I have yet had or seen from an American ... He has actually trained himself and modernized himself on his own." Monroe did not like Prufrock's "very European world-weariness", according to Humphrey Carpenter, but she published it anyway, in June 1915.

Pound's Cathay, published in April 1915, contains 25 examples of Classical Chinese poetry that Pound translated into English based on the notes of the Orientalist Ernest Fenollosa. Fenollosa's widow, Mary McNeill Fenollosa, had given Pound her husband's notes in 1913, after Laurence Binyon introduced them. Michael Alexander saw Cathay as the most attractive of Pound's work. There is a debate about whether the poems should be viewed primarily as translations or as contributions to Imagism and the modernization of English poetry. English professor Steven Yao argued that Cathay shows that translation does not need a thorough knowledge of the source language.

Pound's translations from Old English, Latin, Italian, French and Chinese were highly disputed. According to Alexander, they made him more unpopular in some circles than the treason charge. Robert Graves wrote in 1955: "[Pound] knew little Latin, yet he translated Propertius; and less Greek, but he translated Alcaeus; and still less Anglo-Saxon, yet he translated The Seafarer. I once asked Arthur Waley how much Chinese Pound knew; Waley shook his head despondently."

Pound was devastated when Henri Gaudier-Brzeska, from whom he had commissioned a sculpture of himself two years earlier, was killed in the trenches in June 1915. In response, he published Gaudier-Brzeska: A Memoir (1916), writing "A great spirit has been among us, and a great artist has gone." Two months before he died, Gaudier-Brzeska had written to Pound to say that he kept Cathay in his pocket "to put courage in my fellows".

"Three Cantos", resignation from Poetry
After the publication of Cathay, Pound mentioned that he was working on a long poem. He described it in September 1915 as a "cryselephantine poem of immeasurable length which will occupy me for the next four decades unless it becomes a bore". In February 1916, when Pound was 30, the poet Carl Sandburg paid tribute to him in Poetry magazine. Pound "stains darkly and touches softly", he wrote:

All talk on modern poetry, by people who know, ends with dragging in Ezra Pound somewhere. He may be named only to be cursed as wanton and mocker, poseur, trifler and vagrant. Or he may be classed as filling a niche today like that of Keats in a preceding epoch. The point is, he will be mentioned. ...In the cool and purple meantime, Pound goes ahead producing new poems having the slogan, "Guts and Efficiency," emblazoned above his daily program of work. His genius runs to various schools and styles. He acquires traits and then throws them away. One characteristic is that he has no characteristics. He is a new roamer of the beautiful, a new fetcher of wild shapes, in each new handful of writings offered us.

In June, July and August 1917 Pound had the first three cantos published, as "Three Cantos", in Poetry. He was now a regular contributor to three literary magazines. From 1917 he wrote music reviews for the New Age as William Atheling and art reviews as B. H. Dias. In May 1917 Margaret Anderson hired him as foreign editor of the Little Review. He also wrote weekly pieces for The Egoist and the Little Review; many of the latter complained about provincialism, which included the ringing of church bells. (When Pound lived near St Mary Abbots church in Kensington, he had "engaged in a fierce, guerrilla warfare of letters" about the bells with the vicar, Reverend R. E. Pennefather, according to Richard Aldington.) The volume of writing exhausted him. In 1918, after a bout of illness which was presumably the Spanish flu, he decided to stop writing for the Little Review. He had asked the publisher for a raise to hire a typist, the 23-year-old Iseult Gonne, causing rumors that they were having an affair, but he was turned down.

A suspicion arose in June 1918 that Pound himself had written an article in The Egoist praising his own work, and it was clear from the response that he had acquired enemies. The poet F. S. Flint told The Egoist editor that "we are all tired of Mr. Pound". British literary circles were "tired of his antics" and of him "puffing and swelling himself and his friends", Flint wrote. "His work has deteriorated from book to book; his manners have become more and more offensive; and we wish he would go back to America."

The March 1919 issue of Poetry published Pound's Poems from the Propertius Series, which appeared to be a translation of the Latin poet Sextus Propertius. Harriet Monroe, editor of Poetry, published a letter in April 1919 from a professor of Latin, W. G. Hale, who found "about three-score errors" in the text; he said Pound was "incredibly ignorant of Latin", that "much of what he makes his author say is unintelligible", and that "If Mr. Pound were a professor of Latin, there would be nothing left for him but suicide" (adding "I do not counsel this"). Pound replied to Monroe: "Cat-piss and porcupines!! The thing is no more a translation than my 'Altaforte' is a translation, or than Fitzgerald's Omar is a translation." His letter ended "In final commiseration". Monroe interpreted his silence after that as his resignation from Poetry magazine.

Hugh Selwyn Mauberley

By 1919 Pound felt there was no reason to stay in England. He had become "violently hostile" to England, according to Richard Aldington, feeling he was being "frozen out of everything" except the New Age, and concluding that the British were insensitive to "mental agility in any and every form". He had "muffed his chances of becoming literary director of London—to which he undoubtedly aspired," Aldington wrote in 1941, "by his own enormous conceit, folly, and bad manners."

Published by John Rodker's The Ovid Press in June 1920, Pound's poem Hugh Selwyn Mauberley marked his farewell to London, and by December the Pounds were subletting their apartment and preparing to move to France. Consisting of 18 short parts, Mauberley describes a poet whose life has become sterile and meaningless. It begins with a satirical analysis of the London literary scene before turning to social criticism, economics, and the war. Here the word usury first appears in his work. Just as Eliot denied he was Prufrock, Pound denied he was Mauberley. In 1932 the critic F. R. Leavis, then director of studies in English at Downing College, Cambridge, called Mauberley "great poetry, at once traditional and original. Mr. Pound's standing as a poet rests on it, and rests securely".

On 13 January 1921 Orage wrote in the New Age: "Mr. Pound has shaken the dust of London from his feet with not too emphatic a gesture of disgust, but, at least, without gratitude to this country. ... [He] has been an exhilarating influence for culture in England; he has left his mark upon more than one of the arts, upon literature, music, poetry and sculpture; and quite a number of men and movements owe their initiation to his self-sacrificing stimulus ..."

With all this, however, Mr. Pound, like so many others who have striven for advancement of intelligence and culture in England, has made more enemies than friends, and far more powerful enemies than friends. Much of the Press has been deliberately closed by cabal to him; his books have for some time been ignored or written down; and he himself has been compelled to live on much less than would support a navvy. His fate, as I have said, is not unusual ... Taken by and large, England hates men of culture until they are dead.

Paris (1921–1924)

Meeting Hemingway, editing The Waste Land

The Pounds settled in Paris around April 1921 and in December moved to an inexpensive ground-floor apartment at 70 bis :fr:Rue Notre-Dame-des-Champs. Pound became friendly with Marcel Duchamp, Fernand Léger, Tristan Tzara, and others of the Dada and Surrealist movements, as well as Basil Bunting. He was introduced to the American writer Gertrude Stein, who was living in Paris. She wrote years later that she liked him but did not find him amusing; he was "a village explainer, excellent if you were a village, but if you were not, not".

Pound's collection Poems 1918–1921 was published in New York by Boni and Liveright in 1921. In December that year Ernest Hemingway, then aged 22, moved to Paris with his wife, Hadley Richardson, and letters of introduction from Sherwood Anderson. In February 1922 the Hemingways visited the Pounds for tea. Although Pound was 14 years older, the men became friends; Hemingway assumed the status of pupil and asked Pound to edit his short stories. Pound introduced him to his contacts, including Lewis, Ford, John Peale Bishop, Malcolm Cowley, and Derek Patmore, while Hemingway tried to teach Pound to box. Unlike Hemingway, Pound was not a drinker and preferred to spend his time in salons or building furniture for his apartment and bookshelves for Sylvia Beach's Shakespeare and Company bookstore.

Eliot sent Pound the manuscript of The Waste Land in 1922. Pound edited it with comments like "make up yr. mind", and reduced it by about half. Eliot wrote in 1946: "I should like to think that the manuscript, with the suppressed passages, had disappeared irrecoverably; yet, on the other hand, I should wish the blue pencilling on it to be preserved as irrefutable evidence of Pound's critical genius." His dedication in The Waste Land was "For Ezra Pound / il miglior fabbro" (the "better craftsman"), from Canto 26 of Dante's Purgatorio.

Meeting Olga Rudge
Pound was 36 when he met the 26-year-old American violinist Olga Rudge in Paris in the summer of 1922. They were introduced at a salon hosted by the American heiress Natalie Barney at her 300-year-old house at 20 Rue Jacob, near the Boulevard Saint-Germain. The two moved in different social circles: Rudge was the daughter of a wealthy Youngstown, Ohio, steel family, living in her mother's Parisian apartment on the Right Bank, socializing with aristocrats, while Pound's friends were mostly impoverished writers of the Left Bank.

Restarting The Cantos

Twice the length of Paradise Lost and 50 times longer than The Waste Land, Pound's 800-page The Cantos ("Canto I" to "Canto CXVI", c. 1917–1962) became his life's work. His obituary in The Times described it as not a great poem, because of the lack of structure, but a great improvisation: "[T]he exasperating form permits the occasional, and in the early Cantos and in The Pisan Cantos not so occasional, irruption of passages of great poetry, hot and burning lava breaking through the cracks in piles of boring scree."

The first three cantos had been published in Poetry magazine in June, July, and August 1917, but in 1922 Pound abandoned most of his work and began again. The early cantos, the "Ur-Cantos", became "Canto I" of the new work. In letters to his father in 1924 and 1927, Pound said The Cantos was like the medley of voices you hear when you turn the radio dial, and "[r]ather like or unlike subject and response and counter subject in fugue":

A.A. Live man goes down into world of Dead.
C.B. The 'repeat in history'.
B.C. The 'magic moment' or moment of metamorphosis, bust thru from quotidien into 'divine or permanent world.' Gods., etc.

Alluding to American, European and Oriental art, history and literature, the work is also autobiographical. In the view of Pound scholar Carroll F. Terrell, it is a great religious poem, describing humanity's journey from hell to paradise, a "revelation of how divinity is manifested in the universe ... the kind of intelligence that makes the cherrystone become a cherry tree." The poet Allen Tate argued in 1949 that it is "about nothing at all ... a voice but no subject". Responding to A Draft of XXX Cantos (1930), F. R. Leavis criticized its "lack of form, grammar, principle and direction". The lack of form became a common criticism. Pound wrote in the final complete canto, "Canto CXVI" (116, first published in the Paris Review in 1962), that he could not "make it cohere", although a few lines later, referring to the universe: "it coheres all right / even if my notes do not cohere." According to Pound scholar Walter Baumann, the demigod of "Canto CXVI"—"And I am not a demigod"—is Heracles of Sophocles' Women of Trachis (450–425 BCE), who exclaims before he dies (based on Pound's translation): "SPLENDOUR, / IT ALL COHERES". "Canto CXVI" ends with the lines "a little light, like a rushlight / to lead back to splendour."

Italy (1924–1939)

Birth of the children
The Pounds were unhappy in Paris. Dorothy complained about the winters and Ezra's health was poor. At one dinner in the Place de l'Odéon, a Surrealist guest high on drugs had tried to stab Pound in the back; Robert McAlmon had wrestled with the attacker, and the guests had managed to leave before the police arrived. For Pound the event underlined that their time in France was over. They decided to move to a quieter place, leaving in October 1924 for the seaside town of Rapallo in northern Italy. Hemingway wrote in a letter that Pound had "indulged in a small nervous breakdown" during the packing, leading to two days at the American Hospital of Paris in Neuilly. During this period the Pounds lived on Dorothy's income, supplemented by dividends from stock she had invested in.

Pregnant by Pound, Olga Rudge followed the couple to Italy, and in July 1925 she gave birth to a daughter, Maria, in a hospital in Brixen. Rudge and Pound placed the baby with a German-speaking peasant woman in Gais, South Tyrol, whose own child had died and who agreed to raise Maria for 200 lire a month. Pound reportedly believed that artists ought not to have children, because in his view motherhood ruined women. According to Hadley Richardson, he took her aside before she and Hemingway left Paris for Toronto to have their child, telling her: "Well, I might as well say goodbye to you here and now because [the baby] is going to change you completely."

At the end of December 1925 Dorothy went on holiday to Egypt, returning on 1 March, and in May the Pounds and Olga Rudge left Rapallo for Paris to attend a semi-private concert performance at the Salle Pleyel of Le Testament de Villon, a one-act opera Pound had composed ("nearly tuneless", according to Carpenter) with the musicians Agnes Bedford and George Antheil. Pound had hired two singers for the performance; Rudge was on violin, Pound played percussion, and Joyce, Eliot and Hemingway were in the audience.

The couple stayed on in Paris after the performance; Dorothy was pregnant and wanted the baby to be born at the American hospital. Hemingway accompanied her there in a taxi for the birth of a son, Omar Pound, on 10 September 1926. (Ezra was an admirer of Fitzgerald's translation of Omar Khayyam.) Ezra signed the birth certificate the following day at Neuilly town hall and wrote to his father, "next generation (male) arrived. Both D & it appear to be doing well." He ended up in the American hospital himself for tests and, he told Olga, a "small operation". Dorothy took Omar to England, where she stayed for a year and thereafter visited him every summer. He was sent to live at first in Felpham, Sussex, with a former superintendent of Norland College, which trains nannies, and later became a boarder at Charterhouse. When Dorothy was in England with Omar during the summers, Ezra would spend the time with Olga. Olga's father helped her buy a house in Venice in 1928, and from 1930 she also rented the top floor of a house in Sant'Ambrogio, Caso 60, near the Pounds in Rapallo.

The Exile, Dial poetry award

In 1925 a new literary magazine, This Quarter, dedicated its first issue to Pound, including tributes from Hemingway and Joyce. In Hemingway's contribution, "Homage to Ezra", he wrote that Pound "devotes perhaps one fifth of his working time to writing poetry and in this twenty per cent of effort writes a large and distinguished share of the really great poetry that has been written by any American living or dead—or any Englishman living or dead or any Irishman who ever wrote English."

With the rest of his time he tries to advance the fortunes, both material and artistic, of his friends. He defends them when they are attacked, he gets them into magazines and out of jail. He loans them money. He sells their pictures. He arranges concerts for them. He writes articles about them. He introduces them to wealthy women. He gets publishers to take their books. He sits up all night with them when they claim to be dying and he witnesses their wills. He advances them hospital expenses and dissuades them from suicide. And in the end a few of them refrain from knifing him at the first opportunity.

Against Hemingway's positive view of Pound, Richard Aldington told Amy Lowell that year that Pound had been almost forgotten in England: "as the rest of us go up, he goes down", he wrote. In the U.S., Pound won the $2,000 Dial poetry award in 1927 for his translation of the Confucian classic Great Learning. Using the prize money, he launched his own literary magazine, The Exile, in March, but only four issues appeared. It did well in the first year, with contributions from Hemingway, E. E. Cummings, Basil Bunting, Yeats, William Carlos Williams, and Robert McAlmon. Some of the poorest work consisted of Pound's rambling editorials on Confucianism or in praise of Lenin, according to biographer J. J. Wilhelm. His parents visited him in Rapallo that year, seeing him for the first time since 1914. His father had retired, so they moved to Rapallo themselves, taking a small house, Villa Raggio, on a hill above the town.

Antisemitism, social credit

Pound's antisemitism can be traced to at least 1910, when he wrote in Patria Mia, his essays for the New Age: "The Jew alone can retain his detestable qualities, despite climatic conditions." The sentence was removed from the 1950 edition. In 1922 he apparently disliked that so many Jews were contributing to The Dial, and in 1939, when he read his poetry at Harvard, he was said to have included antisemitic poems in the program because he believed there were Jews in the audience.

A friend of Pound's, the writer Lina Caico, wrote to him in March 1937 asking him to use his musical contacts to help a German-Jewish pianist in Berlin who did not have enough money to live on because of the Nuremberg Laws. Normally willing to help fellow artists, Pound replied (at length): "You hit a nice sore spot ... Let her try Rothschild and some of the bastards who are murdering 10 million anglo saxons in England." He nevertheless denied being an antisemite; he said he liked Spinoza, Montaigne, and Alexander del Mar. "What I am driving at", he wrote to Jackson Mac Low, "is that some kike might manage to pin an antisem label on me IF he neglected the mass of my writing."

Pound came to believe that World War I had been caused by finance capitalism, which he called "usury", and that the Jews had been to blame. He believed the solution lay in C. H. Douglas's idea of social credit. Pound several times used the term Leihkapital (loan capital), equating it with Jews. Hitler had used the same term in Mein Kampf (1926). "Your enemy is Das Leihkapital," Pound wrote in a 1942 radio script aimed at the UK, "international, wandering Loan Capital. Your enemy is not Germany, your enemy is money on loan. And it would be better to be infected with typhus ... than to be infected with this blindness which prevents you from understanding HOW you are undermined ... The big Jew is so bound up with this Leihkapital that no one is able to unscramble that omelet." The argument ran that without "usury" and Jews, there would be no class conflict.

In addition to presenting his economic ideas in hundreds of articles and in The Cantos, Pound wrote over 1,000 letters a year throughout the 1930s. From 1932 he wrote 180 articles  for The New English Weekly, a social-credit journal founded by A. R. Orage, and 60 for Il Mare, a Rapallo newspaper. He wrote to Bill Bird that the press in Paris was controlled by the Comité des forges. He also came under the influence of Charles Maurras, who led the far-right Action Française. From around 1932 he began using a dating system that counted Benito Mussolini's March on Rome in October 1922 as year zero.

Meeting Mussolini

In December 1932 Pound requested a meeting with Mussolini after being hired to work on a film script about Italian fascism. Pound had asked to see Mussolini previously—Olga Rudge had played privately for Mussolini on 19 February 1927—but this time he was given an audience. They met on 30 January 1933 at the Palazzo Venezia in Rome, the day Hitler was appointed Chancellor of Germany.

When Pound handed Mussolini a copy of A Draft of XXX Cantos, Mussolini reportedly said of a passage Pound highlighted that it was not English. Pound said: "No, it's my idea of the way a continental Jew would speak English", to which Mussolini replied "How entertaining" (divertente). Pound tried to discuss an 18-point draft of his economic theories. (Daniel Swift writes that this story has been "told and retold, and in each version, the details shift".) Pound recorded the meeting in "Canto XLI". "XI of our era"—1933, 11 years after the March on Rome—is an example of his new dating system.

Pound wrote to C. H. Douglas that he had "never met anyone who seemed to get my ideas so quickly as the boss". The meeting left him feeling that he had become a person of influence, Redman writes, someone who had been consulted by a head of state. When he returned to Rapallo, he was greeted at the station by the town band.

Immediately after the meeting Pound began writing The ABC of Economics and Jefferson and/or Mussolini: L'Idea Statale Fascism as I Have Seen It (1935). The latter was ready by the end of February, although he had trouble finding a publisher. In 1942 Pound told Italy's Royal Finance Office that he had written the book for propaganda purposes in Italy's interests. He wrote articles praising Mussolini and fascism for T. S. Eliot's The Criterion in July 1933, the New York World Telegram in November 1933, the Chicago Tribune on 9 April 1934, and in 65 articles for the British-Italian Bulletin, published by the Italian Embassy in London.

Pound's antisemitism deepened with the introduction in Italy of the racial laws in 1938, preceded by the publication in July that year of the Manifesto of Race. Mussolini instituted restrictions against Jews, who had to register. Foreign Jews lost their Italian citizenship, and on 18 September 1938 Mussolini declared Judaism "an irreconcilable enemy of fascism".

Visit to America

When Olivia Shakespear died in October 1938 in London, Dorothy asked Ezra to organize the funeral, where he saw their 12-year-old son, Omar, for the first time in eight years. He visited Eliot and Wyndham Lewis, who produced a famous portrait of Pound reclining.

Believing he could stop America's involvement in World War II, Pound sailed for New York in April 1939 on the SS Rex in a first-class suite. Giving interviews on the deck in a tweed jacket, he told reporters that Mussolini wanted peace. In Washington, D.C. he attended a session of Congress, sitting in a section of the gallery reserved for relatives (because of Thaddeus Coleman Pound). He lobbied senators and congressmen, had lunch with the Polish ambassador, warning him not to trust the English or Winston Churchill, and asked to see the President but was told it could not be done.

He took part in a poetry reading at Harvard, where he agreed to be recorded by the Department of Speech, and in July he received an honorary doctorate from Hamilton College, along with the radio commentator H. V. Kaltenborn. Kaltenborn, whom Pound referred to at the time as Kaltenstein, gave an anti-fascist speech after lunch ("dictatorships shall die, but democracies shall live"), which Pound interrupted loudly to the point where, according to one account, the college president had to intervene. Pound described this years later to Wyndham Lewis: "That was a music hall day, with a stage set/ only at a Kawledg Komencement wd/ one git in mouth-shot at that sort of wind-bag/ that fahrt Kaltenbourne." Pound sailed back to Italy a few days later on the SS Conte di Savoia.

Between May and September 1939 Pound wrote 12 articles for the Japan Times (he became their "Italian correspondent"), which included the claim that "Democracy is now currently defined in Europe as a 'country run by Jews'". He discussed the "essential fairness of Hitler's war aims" and wrote that Churchill was a senile front for the Rothschilds.

World War II and radio broadcasts (1939–1945)

Letter-writing campaign

When war broke out in September 1939, Pound began a letter-writing campaign to the politicians he had petitioned months earlier. On 18 June 1940, after the fall of France, he wrote to Senator Burton K. Wheeler: "I have read a regulation that only those foreigners are to be admitted to the U.S. who are deemed to be useful etc/. The dirtiest jews from Paris, Blum??" He explained that they were all a pox. To his publisher, James Laughlin, he wrote that "Roosevelt represents Jewry" and signed off with "Heil Hitler". He began calling Roosevelt "Jewsfeldt" or "Stinky Rooosenstein". In Meridiano di Roma he compared Hitler and Mussolini to Confucius. In Oswald Mosley's newspaper, Action, he wrote that the English were "a slave race governed by the House of Rothschild since Waterloo". By May 1940, according to the historian Matthew Feldman, the British government regarded Pound as "a principal supplier of information to the BUF [British Union of Fascists] from abroad". His literary agent in New York, John J. Slocum, urged him to return to writing poetry and literary criticism; instead, Pound sent Slocum political manifestos, which he declined to attempt to publish in the United States.

Radio broadcasts

Between 23 January 1941 and 28 March 1945, including during the Holocaust in Italy, Pound recorded or composed hundreds of broadcasts for Italian radio, mostly for EIAR (Radio Rome) and later for a radio station in the Salò Republic, the Nazi puppet state in northern and central Italy. Broadcast in English, and sometimes in Italian, German, and French, the EIAR program was transmitted to England, central Europe, and the United States.

Styling himself "Dr Ezra Pound" (his only doctorate was the honorary one from Hamilton College), he attacked the United States, Roosevelt, Roosevelt's family, Churchill, and the Jews. He praised Hitler, recommended eugenics to "conserve the best of the race", and referred to Jews as "filth". The broadcasts were monitored by the United States Foreign Broadcast Monitoring Service, and on 26 July 1943 the United States District Court for the District of Columbia indicted Pound in absentia for treason. According to Feldman, the Pound archives at Yale contain receipts for 195 payments from the Italian Ministry of Popular Culture from 22 April 1941 to 26 January 1944. Over 33 months, Pound received 250,000 lire (then equivalent to $12,500; $185,000 as of 2013).

On 9–10 September 1943, the German Wehrmacht occupied northern and central Italy. Hitler appointed Mussolini head of a fascist puppet state, the Italian Social Republic or Salò Republic. Pound called it the "Republic of Utopia". SS officers began concentrating Jews in transit camps before deporting them to Auschwitz-Birkenau. Of the first group of 1,034 Jews to arrive in Auschwitz from Rome on 23 October 1943 839 were gassed.

On or around 23 November 1943, he met Fernando Mezzasoma, the new Minister of Popular Culture, in Salò. Pound wrote to Dorothy from Salò asking if she could obtain a radio confiscated from the Jews to give to Rudge, so that Rudge could help with his work.

From 1 December 1943 Pound began writing scripts for the state's new radio station. The following day he suggested to Alessandro Pavolini, secretary of the Republican Fascist Party, that book stores be legally obliged to showcase certain books, including The Protocols of the Elders of Zion (1903), a hoax document purporting to be a Jewish plan to dominate the world. "The arrest of Jews will create a wave of useless mercy," Pound wrote, "thus the need to disseminate the Protocols. The intellectuals are capable of a passion more durable than emotional, but they need to understand the reasons for a conflict." On 26 January 1945, in a script called "Corpses of Course" for the program Jerry's Front Calling, Pound wrote: "Why shouldn't there be one grand beano; wiping out Sieff and Kuhn and Loeb and Guggenheim and Stinkenfinger and the rest of the nazal bleaters?"

Arrest for treason

In May 1944 the German military, trying to secure the coast against the Allies, forced the Pounds to evacuate their seafront apartment in Rapallo. From then until the end of the war, the couple lived with Rudge in her home above Rapallo at Sant' Ambrogio. There were food shortages, no coffee, and no newspapers, telephones, or letters. According to Rudge, Ezra and Dorothy would spend their nights listening to the BBC. In addition to the radio scripts, Pound was writing for the newspaper Il Popolo di Alessandria. He wanted to write for the more reputable Corriere della Sera in Milan, but the editor regarded his Italian as "incomprehensible".

Mussolini and his mistress, Clara Petacci, were shot by Italian partisans on 28 April 1945. Their bodies were displayed in the Piazzale Loreto in Milan, abused by the crowd, then left hanging upside down. "Thus Ben and la Clara a Milano / by the heels at Milano". On 3 May armed partisans arrived at Rudge's home to find Pound alone. He picked up the Confucian text Four Books and a Chinese–English dictionary and was taken to their headquarters in Zoagli, then at his request to the U.S. Counter Intelligence Corps headquarters in Genoa, where he was interrogated by FBI agent Frank L. Amprin.

Pound asked to send a cable to President Truman to help negotiate a "just peace" with Japan. He wanted to make a final broadcast called "Ashes of Europe Calling", in which he would recommend not only peace with Japan, but American management of Italy, the establishment of a Jewish state in Palestine, and leniency toward Germany. His requests were denied and the script was forwarded to J. Edgar Hoover. A few days later Amprin removed over 7,000 letters, articles and other documents from Rudge's home as evidence. On 8 May, the day Germany surrendered, Pound gave the Americans a further statement:

I am not anti-Semitic, and I distinguish between the Jewish usurer and the Jew who does an honest day's work for a living. Hitler and Mussolini were simple men from the country. I think that Hitler was a Saint, and wanted nothing for himself. I think that he was fooled into anti-Semitism and it ruined him. That was his mistake. When you see the "mess" that Italy gets into by bumping off Mussolini, you will see why someone could believe in some of his efforts.

Later that day he told an American reporter, Edd Johnson, that Hitler was "a Jeanne d'Arc ... Like many martyrs, he held extreme views". Mussolini was "a very human, imperfect character who lost his head". On 24 May he was transferred to the United States Army Disciplinary Training Center north of Pisa, where he was placed in one of the camp's  outdoor steel cages, with tar paper covers, lit up at night by floodlights. Engineers reinforced his cage the night before he arrived in case fascist sympathizers tried to break him out.

Pound lived in isolation in the heat, sleeping on the concrete, denied exercise and communication, apart from daily access to the chaplain. After three weeks, he stopped eating. He recorded what seemed to be a breakdown in "Canto LXXX", where Odysseus is saved from drowning by Leucothea: "hast'ou swum in a sea of air strip / through an aeon of nothingness, / when the raft broke and the waters went over me". Medical staff moved him out of the cage the following week. On 14 and 15 June he was examined by psychiatrists, after which he was transferred to his own tent. He began to write, drafting what became known as The Pisan Cantos. The existence of two sheets of toilet paper showing the first ten lines of "Canto LXXIV" in pencil suggests he started it while in the cage.

United States (1945–1958)

St. Elizabeths Hospital

Pound arrived back in Washington, D.C. on 18 November 1945, two days before the start of the Nuremberg trials. Lt. Col. P. V. Holder, one of the escorting officers, wrote in an affidavit that Pound was "an intellectual 'crackpot'" who intended to conduct his own defense. Dorothy would not allow it; Pound wrote in a letter: "Tell Omar I favour a defender who has written a life of J. Adams and translated Confucius. Otherwise how CAN he know what it is about?"

He was arraigned on 27 November on charges of treason, and on 4 December he was placed in a locked room in the psychiatric ward of Gallinger Hospital. Three court-appointed psychiatrists, including Winfred Overholser, superintendent of St. Elizabeths Hospital, decided that he was mentally unfit to stand trial. They found him "abnormally grandiose ... expansive and exuberant in manner, exhibiting pressure of speech, discursiveness and distractibility." A fourth psychiatrist appointed by Pound's lawyer initially thought he was a psychopath, which would have made him fit to stand trial.

On 21 December 1945, as case no. 58,102, he was transferred to Howard Hall, St. Elizabeths' maximum security ward, where he was held in a single cell with peepholes. Visitors were admitted to the waiting room for 15 minutes at a time, while patients wandered around screaming. A hearing on 13 February 1946 concluded that he was of "unsound mind"; he shouted in court: "I never did believe in Fascism, God damn it; I am opposed to Fascism." Pound's lawyer, Julien Cornell, requested his release at a hearing in January 1947. As a compromise, Overholser moved him to the more comfortable Cedar Ward on the third floor of the east wing of St. Elizabeths' Center Building. In early 1948 he was moved again, this time to a larger room in Chestnut Ward.

Tytell writes that Pound was in his element in Chestnut Ward. At last provided for, he was allowed to read, write, and receive visitors, including Dorothy for several hours a day. (In October 1946 Dorothy had been placed in charge of his "person and property".) His room had a typewriter, floor-to-ceiling book shelves, and bits of paper hanging on string from the ceiling with ideas for The Cantos. He had turned a small alcove on the ward into his living room, where he entertained friends and literary figures. It reached the point where he refused to discuss any attempt to have him released.

The Pisan Cantos, Bollingen Prize

James Laughlin of New Directions had Cantos LXXIV–LXXXIV, known as The Pisan Cantos, ready for publication in 1946 and gave Pound an advance copy, but Laughlin held back, waiting for the right time to publish. A group of Pound's friends—T. S. Eliot, E. E. Cummings, W. H. Auden, Allen Tate, and Joseph Cornell—met Laughlin in June 1948 to discuss how to get Pound released. They planned to have him awarded the first Bollingen Prize, a new national poetry award with $1,000 prize money donated by the Mellon family.

The awards committee consisted of 15 fellows of the Library of Congress, including several of Pound's supporters, such as Eliot, Tate, Conrad Aiken, Katherine Anne Porter, and Theodore Spencer. The idea was that the Justice Department would be in an untenable position if Pound won a major award and was not released. Laughlin published The Pisan Cantos on 20 July 1948, and the following February the prize went to Pound. There were two dissenting voices, Katherine Garrison Chapin and Karl Shapiro; the latter said he could not vote for an antisemite because he was Jewish himself. Pound had apparently prepared a statement—"No comment from the Bug House"—but decided instead to stay silent.

There was uproar. The Pittsburgh Post-Gazette quoted critics who said that poetry cannot "convert words into maggots that eat at human dignity and still be good poetry". Robert Hillyer, a Pulitzer Prize winner and president of the Poetry Society of America, attacked the committee in The Saturday Review of Literature, telling journalists that he "never saw anything to admire, not one line, in Pound". Congressman Jacob K. Javits demanded an investigation into the awards committee. It was the last time the Library of Congress administered the prize.

Diagnosis
During a case conference at St. Elizabeths on 28 January 1946, six psychiatrists had concluded that Pound had psychopathic personality disorder but was not psychotic. Present during the meeting, he decided to lie on the floor while the psychiatrists interviewed him. In 1952 the American Psychiatric Association published its first Diagnostic and Statistical Manual of Mental Disorders (DSM-1), and St. Elizabeths began diagnosing patients according to its definitions. In July 1953 a psychiatrist added to Pound's notes that he probably had narcissistic personality disorder. The main feature of Pound's personality, he wrote, was his "profound, incredible, over-weaning (sic) narcissism". A personality disorder, unlike conditions that give rise to psychosis, is not regarded as a mental illness, and the diagnosis would have made Pound fit to stand trial. On 31 May 1955, at the request of the hospital's superintendent Winfred Overholser, the diagnosis was changed to "psychotic disorder, undifferentiated", which is classified as mental illness. In 1966, after his release from St. Elizabeths, Pound was diagnosed with bipolar disorder.

Mullins and Kasper
While in St. Elizabeths, Pound would often decline to talk to psychiatrists with names he deemed Jewish (he called psychiatrists "kikiatrists"), and he apparently told Charles Olson: "I was a Zionist in Italy, but now I'm for pogroms, after what I've experienced in here (SLiz)." He advised visitors to read the Protocols of the Elders of Zion, and he referred to any visitor he happened not to like as Jewish. In November 1953 he wrote to Olivia Rossetti Agresti that Hitler was "bit by dirty Jew mania for World Domination, as yu used to point out/ this WORST of German diseases was got from yr/ idiolized and filthy biblical bastards. Adolf clear on the baccilus of kikism/ that is on nearly all the other poisons.[sic] but failed to get a vaccine against that."

Pound struck up a friendship with Eustace Mullins, apparently associated with the Aryan League of America and author of the 1961 biography This Difficult Individual, Ezra Pound. Even more damaging was his friendship with John Kasper, a Ku Klux Klan member who, after Brown v. Board of Education (a 1954 U.S. Supreme Court decision mandating racial desegregation in public schools), set up a Citizens' Council chapter, the Seaboard White Citizens' Council in Washington. Members had to be white, supportive of racial segregation, and believers in the divinity of Jesus. Kasper wrote to Pound after admiring him at university, and the two became friends. In 1953 Kasper opened a far-right bookstore, "Make it New", at 169 Bleecker Street, Greenwich Village, that displayed Pound's work in the window. With Pound's cooperation, he and another Pound admirer, T. David Horton, set up Square Dollar Series, a publishing imprint that reprinted Pound's books and others he approved of.

It became increasingly clear that Pound was schooling Kasper in the latter's pro-segregation activism. In January and February 1957 the New York Herald Tribune ran a series of articles on their relationship, after which the FBI began photographing Pound's visitors. One article alleged that some of Kasper's pamphlets had, as John Tytell put it, "a distinctly Poundian ring" to them. Kasper was jailed in 1956 over a speech he made in Clinton, Tennessee, and he was questioned about the 1957 bombing of the Hattie Cotton School in Nashville. After Pound left hospital in 1958, the men kept in touch; he wrote to Kasper on 17 April 1959: "Antisemitism is a card in the enemy program, don't play it. ... They RELY ON YOUR PLAYING IT."

New Times articles
Between late 1955 and early 1957, Pound wrote at least 80 unsigned or pseudonymous articles—"often ugly", Swift notes—for the New Times of Melbourne, a newspaper connected to the social-credit movement. Noel Stock, one of Pound's correspondents and early biographers, worked for the paper and published Pound's articles there. A 24-year-old radio reporter at the time, Stock first wrote to Pound in hospital after reading The Pisan Cantos.

In the New Times in April 1956, Pound wrote: "Our Victorian forebears would have been greatly scandalized at the idea that one might not be free to study inherited racial characteristics," and "Some races are retentive, mainly of the least desirable bits of their barbaric past." There was a "Jewish-Communist plot", which he compared to syphilis. Equality was dismissed as "anti-biological nonsense". "There were no gas ovens in Italy", he wrote in April 1956; a month later he referred to the "fuss about Hitler". On 10 August 1956: "It is perfectly well known that the fuss about 'de-segregation' in the United States has been started by Jews." Instead, America needed "race pride". Using pseudonyms, he sent his articles directly to Stock, so that the newspaper's editor may not have realized they had all been written by Pound. Stock sent Pound copies of the published articles, which he would distribute to his followers. He contributed similar material to other publications, including Edge, which Stock founded in October 1956. Stock called Edge the magazine of the "international Poundian underground".

Release

Pound's friends continued to try to get him out of St. Elizabeths. In 1948, in an effort to present his radio broadcasts as harmless, Olga Rudge self-published six of them (on cultural topics only) as If This Be Treason. She visited him twice, in 1952 and 1955, but could not convince him to be more assertive about his release. In 1950 she had written to Hemingway to complain that Pound's friends had not done enough. Hemingway and Rudge did not like each other. He told Dorothy in 1951 that "the person who makes least sense ...in all this is Olga Rudge". In what John Cohassey called a "controlled, teeth-gritting response", Hemingway replied to Rudge that he would pardon Pound if he could, but that Pound had "made the rather serious mistake of being a traitor to his country, and temporarily he must lie in the bed he made". He ended by saying "To be even more blunt, I have always loved Dorothy, and still do."

Four years later, shortly after he won the Nobel Prize in Literature in 1954, Hemingway told Time magazine ..."I believe this would be a good year to release poets." The poet Archibald MacLeish asked him in June 1957 to write a letter on Pound's behalf. Hemingway believed Pound would not stop making inappropriate statements and friendships, but he signed MacLeish's letter anyway and pledged $1,500 to be handed to Pound upon his release. In an interview for the Paris Review in early 1958, Hemingway said that Pound should be released and Kasper jailed.

Several publications began campaigning in 1957. Le Figaro published an appeal titled "The Lunatic at St Elizabeths". The New Republic, Esquire, and The Nation followed suit. The Nation argued that Pound was a "sick and vicious old man", but that he had rights. In 1958 MacLeish hired Thurman Arnold, a prestigious lawyer who ended up charging no fee, to file a motion to dismiss the 1945 indictment. Overholser, the hospital's superintendent, supported the application with an affidavit stating Pound was permanently and incurably insane, and that confinement served no therapeutic purpose. The motion was heard on 18 April 1958 by Chief Judge Bolitha Laws, who had committed Pound to St. Elizabeths in 1945. The Justice Department did not oppose the motion, and Pound was discharged on 7 May.

Italy (1958–1972)

Depression

When asked when he had been released from the mental hospital, he replied: "I never was. When I left the hospital I was still in America, and all America is an insane asylum." They were accompanied by a young teacher Pound had met in hospital, Marcella Spann, ostensibly acting as his secretary. Disembarking at Genoa, the group arrived three days later at Schloss Brunnenburg, near Merano in South Tyrol, to live with his daughter Maria, where Pound met his grandchildren for the first time. Dorothy had usually ignored his affairs, but she used her legal power over his royalties to make sure Spann was seen off, sent back to the United States in October 1959.

By December 1959 Pound was mired in depression. According to the writer Michael Reck, who visited him several times at St. Elizabeths, Pound was a changed man; he said little and called his work "worthless". In a 1960 interview in Rome with Donald Hall for Paris Review, he said: "You—find me—in fragments." He paced up and down during the three days it took to complete the interview, never finishing a sentence, bursting with energy one minute, then sagging, and at one point seemed about to collapse. Hall said it was clear that he "doubted the value of everything he had done in his life".

Those close to him thought he had dementia, and in mid-1960 he spent time in a clinic when his weight dropped. He picked up again, but by early 1961 he had a urinary tract infection. Dorothy felt unable to look after him, so he went to live with Olga Rudge, first in Rapallo then in Venice; Dorothy mostly stayed in London after that with Omar. In 1961 Pound attended a meeting in Rome in honor of Oswald Mosley, who was visiting Italy. His health continued to decline, and his friends were dying: Wyndham Lewis in 1957, Ernest Hemingway in 1961 (Hemingway shot himself), E. E. Cummings in 1962, William Carlos Williams in 1963, and T. S. Eliot in 1965. In 1963 he told an interviewer, Grazia Livi: "I spoil everything I touch. ... All my life I believed I knew nothing, yes, knew nothing. And so words became devoid of meaning." He attended Eliot's funeral in London and visited W. B. Yeats' widow in Dublin (Yeats died in 1939).

In 1966 he was admitted to the Genoa School of Medicine's psychiatric hospital for an evaluation after prostate surgery. His notes said he had psychomotor retardation, insomnia, depression, and he believed he had been "contaminated by microbes". According to a psychiatrist who treated him, Pound had previously been treated with electroconvulsive therapy. This time he was given imipramine and responded well. The doctors diagnosed bipolar disorder. Two years later he attended the opening of an exhibition in New York featuring his blue-inked version of Eliot's The Waste Land. He went on to Hamilton College and received a standing ovation.

Meeting Ginsberg, Reck, and Russell

Pound's biographer, Michael Reck, claimed to have had an encounter with Pound at the restaurant of the Pensione Cici in Venice in 1967, during which Pound told Allen Ginsberg and Peter Russell that his own poems were "a lot of double talk" and made no sense, and that his writing was "a mess", "stupid and ignorant all the way through". Reck wrote about the meeting in Evergreen Review the following year. "At seventy I realized that instead of being a lunatic, I was a moron," Pound reportedly said. He "looked very morose" and barely spoke: "There is nothing harder than conversing with Pound nowadays," Reck wrote.

Pound had offered a carefully worded rejection of his antisemitism, according to Reck. When Ginsberg reassured Pound that he had "shown us the way", he is said to have replied: "Any good I've done has been spoiled by bad intentions—the preoccupation with irrelevant and stupid things." Reck continued: "Then very slowly, with emphasis, surely conscious of Ginsberg's being Jewish: 'But the worst mistake I made was that stupid, suburban prejudice of anti-Semitism.'"

Matthias Koehl, an American neo-Nazi who had met with Pound during the latter's incarceration at St. Elizabeths Hospital, cast doubt on these claims, writing in 1990 that "The Ezra Pound I knew was cheerfully unrepentant, firm in his beliefs, and staunchly true to those principles he had upheld throughout his life. Never once did he give so much as the slightest hint that he had any regret about anything he had ever done or spoken during the ’30s and ’40s — not excluding his celebrated views on the Jewish Question. In fact, his pointed references to any number of nefarious Jewish practices left no doubt as to where he stood on that particular issue ... Unable to deny the manifest greatness of a literary giant but concerned lest Pound’s 'other ideas' gain acceptance, [Ginsberg] employs one of the oldest tricks in the book: he tries to have the master himself recant. But the master — 'il miglior fabbro' — has spoken otherwise!"

Death

Shortly before his death in 1972, an American Academy of Arts and Sciences committee, which included his publisher James Laughlin, proposed that Pound be awarded the Emerson-Thoreau Medal. After a storm of protest, the academy's council opposed it by 13 to 9. In the foreword of a Faber & Faber volume of his prose, he wrote in July: "In sentences referring to groups or races 'they' should be used with great care. re USURY: / I was out of focus, taking a symptom for a cause. / The cause is AVARICE."

On his 87th birthday, on 30 October 1972, he was too weak to leave his bedroom. The next night he was admitted to the San Giovanni e Paolo Civil Hospital in Venice, where he died in his sleep on 1 November of "sudden blockage of the intestine". Alerted by telegram, Dorothy Pound, who was living in a care home near Cambridge, England, requested a Protestant funeral in Venice. Telegrams were sent via American embassies in Rome and London, and the consulate in Milan, but Rudge would not change the plans she had already made for the morning of 3 November. Omar Pound flew to Venice as soon as he could, with Peter du Sautoy of Faber & Faber, but he arrived too late. Four gondoliers dressed in black rowed Pound's body to Venice's municipal cemetery, Isola di San Michele, where, after a Protestant service, he was buried, near Diaghilev and Stravinsky, with other non-Italian Christians. According to Hugh Kenner, Pound had wanted to be buried in Idaho with his bust by Henri Gaudier-Brzeska on his grave. Dorothy Pound died in England the following year, aged 87. Olga Rudge died in 1996, aged 100, and was buried next to Pound.

Critical reception

Rehabilitation efforts, scholarship

After the Bollingen Prize in 1949, Pound's friends made every effort to rehabilitate him. James Laughlin's New Directions Publishing published his Selected Poems, with an introduction by Eliot, and a censored selection of The Cantos. Ralph Fletcher Seymour published Patria Mia (written around 1912) to show that Pound was an American patriot. In advertisements, magazine articles, and critical introductions, Pound's friends and publishers attributed his antisemitism and fascism to mental illness.

Literary scholar Betsy Erkkila writes that no one was more important to Pound's rehabilitation than Hugh Kenner, who was introduced to Pound by Marshall McLuhan in St. Elizabeths in May 1948, when Kenner was 25. Kenner's The Poetry of Ezra Pound (1951) adopted a New Critical approach, where all that mattered was the work itself.

New Directions and Faber & Faber published Ezra Pound: Translations in 1953, introduced by Kenner, and the following year Literary Essays of Ezra Pound, introduced by Eliot. The first PhD dissertation on Pound was completed in 1948, and by 1970 there were around ten a year. Kenner's The Pound Era (1971), which overlooked the fascism, antisemitism, World War II, treason, and the Bollingen Award, effectively equated Pound with modernism. Pound scholar Leon Surette argued that Kenner's approach was hagiographic. He included in this approach Caroll F. Terrell's Paideuma: A Journal Devoted to Ezra Pound Scholarship, founded in 1972 and edited by Kenner and Eva Hesse, and Terrell's two-volume A Companion to the Cantos of Ezra Pound (1980–1984). In 1971 Terrell founded the National Poetry Foundation to focus on Pound, and organized conferences on Pound in 1975, 1980, 1985, and 1990.

Following Eustace Mullins' biography, This Difficult Individual, Ezra Pound (1961), was Life of Ezra Pound (1970) by Noel Stock. A former reporter, Stock was one of the publishers of Pound's newspaper articles in the 1950s, including his antisemitism. Ronald Bush's The Genesis of Ezra Pound's Cantos (1976) became the first critical study of The Cantos. Several significant biographies appeared in the 1980s: J. J. Wilhelm's three-volume work (1985–1994), beginning with The American Roots of Ezra Pound; John Tytell's Ezra Pound: The Solitary Volcano (1987); and Humphrey Carpenter's 1005-page A Serious Character (1988). A. David Moody's three-volume Ezra Pound: Poet (2007–2015) combines biography with literary criticism.

Studies that examine Pound's relationships with the far right include Robert Casillo's The Genealogy of Demons (1988); Tim Redman's Ezra Pound and Italian Fascism (1999); Leon Surette's Pound in Purgatory (1999); Matthew Feldman's Ezra Pound's Fascist Propaganda, 1935–45 (2013); and Alec Marsh's John Kasper and Ezra Pound (2015).

Legacy

Much of Pound's legacy lies in his advancement of some of the best-known modernist writers of the early 20th century, particularly between 1910 and 1925. In addition to Eliot, Joyce, Lewis, Frost, Williams, Hemingway, H.D., Aldington, and Aiken, he befriended and helped Cummings, Bunting, Ford, Marianne Moore, Louis Zukofsky, Jacob Epstein, Margaret Anderson, George Oppen, and Charles Olson.

Beyond this, his legacy is mixed. He was a strong lyricist with an "ear" for words; his Times obituary said he had a "faultless sense of cadence". According to Ira Nadel, he "overturned poetic meter, literary style, and the state of the long poem". Nadel cited the importance of Pound's editing of The Waste Land, the publication of Ulysses, and his role in developing of Imagism. Hugh Witemeyer argued that Imagism was "probably the most important single movement" in 20th-century English-language poetry, because it affected all the leading poets of Pound's generation and the two generations after him. According to Hugh Kenner in 1951, although no great contemporary writer was less read than Pound, there was no one who could "over and over again appeal more surely, through sheer beauty of language" to people who would otherwise rather talk about poets than read them.

Against this, Robert Conquest argued in 1979 that critics were responsible for having promoted Pound despite his "minimal talent", which was "grossly exaggerated". "This is an accusation less against the fantastic arrogance of Pound", he wrote, "than against the narrow-minded obscurantism of the departments of English and the critical establishment who have set up a system of apologetics which the slyest Jesuit of the seventeenth century would have baulked at." According to Samuel Putnam, those who respected Pound's poetry were less likely to respect his prose or work as a critic.

The outrage over his collaboration with the Axis powers was so deep that it dominated the discussion. "A greater calamity cannot befall the art", Arthur Miller wrote in December 1945, "than that Ezra Pound, the Mussolini mouthpiece, should be welcomed back as an arbiter of American letters ..." Over the decades, according to Redman, critics argued that Pound was not really a poet or not really a fascist, or that he was a fascist but his poetry is not fascistic, or that there was an evil Pound and a good Pound. The American poet Elizabeth Bishop, 1956 Pulitzer Prize winner and one of his hospital visitors—Pound called her "Liz Bish"—reflected the ambivalence in her poem "Visits to St. Elizabeths" (1957). "This is the time / of the tragic man / that lies in the house of Bedlam." As the poem progresses, the tragic man, never named, becomes the talkative man; the honored man; the old, brave man; the cranky man; the cruel man; the busy man; the tedious man; the poet, the man; and, finally, the wretched man.

Selected works

 (1908). A Lume Spento. Venice: A. Antonini (poems, privately printed).
 (1908). A Quinzaine for This Yule. London: Pollock (poems, privately printed); and Elkin Mathews.
 (1909). Personae. London: Elkin Mathews (poems).
 (1909). Exultations. London: Elkin Mathews (poems).
 (1910). The Spirit of Romance. London: J. M. Dent & Sons (prose).
 (1910). Provenca. Boston: Small, Maynard and Company (poems).
 (1911). Canzoni. London: Elkin Mathews (poems)
 (1912). The Sonnets and Ballate of Guido Cavalcanti Boston: Small, Maynard and Company (translations; cheaper edition destroyed by fire, London: Swift & Co).
 (1912). Ripostes. S. Swift, London, (poems; first mention of Imagism)
 (1915). Cathay. Elkin Mathews (poems; translations)
 (1916). Gaudier-Brzeska. A Memoir. London: John Lane (prose).
 (1916). Certain Noble Plays of Japan: From the Manuscripts of Ernest Fenollosa, chosen by Ezra Pound.
 (1916) with Ernest Fenollosa. "Noh", or, Accomplishment: A Study of the Classical Stage of Japan. London: Macmillan and Co.
 (1916). Lustra. London: Elkin Mathews (poems).
 (1917). Twelve Dialogues of Fontenelle (translations).
 (1917). Lustra. New York: Alfred A. Knopf (poems, with the first "Three Cantos").
 (1918). Pavannes and Divisions New York: Alfred A. Knopf (prose).
 (1918). Quia Pauper Amavi London: Egoist Press (poems).
 (1919). The Fourth Canto. London: Ovid Press (poem).
 (1920). Hugh Selwyn Mauberley. London: Ovid Press (poem).
 (1920). Umbra. London: Elkin Mathews (poems and translations).
 (1920) with Ernest Fenollosa. Instigations: Together with an Essay on the Chinese Written Character. New York: Boni & Liveright (prose).
 (1921). Poems, 1918–1921. New York: Boni & Liveright.
 (1922). Remy de Gourmont: The Natural Philosophy of Love. New York: Boni & Liveright (translation).
 (1923). Indiscretions, or, Une revue des deux mondes. Paris: Three Mountains Press.
 (1924) as William Atheling. Antheil and the Treatise on Harmony. Paris (essays).
 (1925). A Draft of XVI Cantos. Paris: Three Mountains Press. The first collection of The Cantos.
 (1926). Personae: The Collected Poems of Ezra Pound. New York: Boni & Liveright.
 (1928). A Draft of the Cantos 17–27. London: John Rodker.
 (1928). Selected Poems. Edited and with an introduction by T. S. Eliot. London: Faber & Faber.
 (1928). Ta Hio: The Great Learning, newly rendered into the American language. Seattle: University of Washington Bookstore (translation).
 (1930). A Draft of XXX Cantos. Paris: Nancy Cunard's Hours Press.
 (1930). Imaginary Letters. Paris: Black Sun Press. Eight essays from the Little Review, 1917–18.
 (1931). How to Read. Harmsworth (essays).
 (1932). Guido Cavalcanti Rime. Genoa: Edizioni Marsano (translations).
 (1933). ABC of Economics. London: Faber & Faber (essays).
 (1934). Eleven New Cantos: XXXI–XLI. New York: Farrar & Rinehart (poems).
 (1934). Homage to Sextus Propertius. London: Faber & Faber (poems).
 (1934). ABC of Reading. New Haven: Yale University Press (essays).
 (1934). Make It New. London: Faber & Faber (essays).
 (1935). Alfred Venison's Poems: Social Credit Themes by the Poet of Titchfield Street. London: Stanley Nott, Ltd. Pamphlets on the New Economics, No. 9 (essays).
 (1935). Jefferson and/or Mussolini. London: Stanley Nott. (essays).
 (1935). Social Credit: An Impact. London: Stanley Nott. (essays). Repr.: Peter Russell (1951). Money Pamphlets by Pound, no. 5, London.
 (1936) with Ernest Fenollosa. The Chinese Written Character as a Medium for Poetry. London: Stanley Nott.
 (1937). The Fifth Decade of Cantos. New York: Farrar & Rinehart (poems).
 (1937). Polite Essays. London: Faber & Faber (essays).
 (1937). Confucius: Digest of the Analects, edited and published by Giovanni Scheiwiller, (translations)
 (1938). Guide to Kulchur. New York: New Directions.
 (1939). What Is Money For?. Greater Britain Publications (essays). Money Pamphlets by Pound, no. 3. London: Peter Russell.
 (1940). Cantos LXII–LXXI. New Directions, New York (John Adams Cantos 62–71).
 (1942). Carta da Visita di Ezra Pound. Edizioni di lettere d'oggi. Rome. English translation by John Drummond: A Visiting Card. Money Pamphlets by Pound, no. 4. London: Peter Russell, 1952 (essays).
 (1944). L'America, Roosevelt e le cause della guerra presente. Casa editrice della edizioni popolari, Venice. English translation, by John Drummond: America, Roosevelt and the Causes of the Present War, Money Pamphlets by Pound, no. 6, Peter Russell, London 1951
 (1944). Introduzione alla Natura Economica degli S.U.A.. Casa editrice della edizioni popolari. Venice. English translation An Introduction to the Economic Nature of the United States, by Carmine Amore. Repr.: Peter Russell, Money Pamphlets by Pound, London 1950 (essay)
 (1944). Orientamenti. Casa editrice dalla edizioni popolari. Venice (prose)
 (1944). Oro et lavoro: alla memoria di Aurelio Baisi. Moderna, Rapallo. English translation: Gold and Work, Money Pamphlets by Pound, no. 2, Peter Russell, London 1952 (essays)
 (1948). If This Be Treason. Siena: privately printed for Olga Rudge by Tip Nuova (original drafts of six of Pound's Radio Rome broadcasts)
 (1948). The Pisan Cantos. New York: New Directions Publishing (Cantos 74–84)
 (1948). The Cantos of Ezra Pound (includes The Pisan Cantos). New Directions, poems
 (1949). Elektra (started in 1949, first performed 1987), a play by Ezra Pound and Rudd Fleming
 (1950). Seventy Cantos. London: Faber & Faber. 
 (1950). Patria Mia. Chicago: R. F. Seymour (reworked New Age articles, 1912–1913). 
 (1951). Confucius: The Great Digest and Unwobbling Pivot. New York: New Directions (translation). 
 (1951). Confucius: Analects (John) Kaspar & (David) Horton, Square $ Series, New York (translation).
 (1954). The Classic Anthology Defined by Confucius. Harvard University Press (translations)
 (1954). Lavoro ed Usura. All'insegna del pesce d'oro. Milan (essays)
 (1955). Section: Rock-Drill, 85–95 de los Cantares. All'insegna del pesce d'oro, Milan (poems)
 (1956). Sophocles: The Women of Trachis. A Version by Ezra Pound. Neville Spearman, London (translation)
 (1957). Brancusi. Milan (essay)
 (1959). Thrones: 96–109 de los Cantares. New York: New Directions (poems).
 (1968). Drafts and Fragments: Cantos CX–CXVII. New York: New Directions (poems).

See also
 John Amery
 Axis Sally (Mildred Gillars, Susan Sweney, Rita Zucca)
 Lord Haw-Haw/William Joyce

Explanatory notes

Citations

Works cited

 Adams, Stephen J. (2005). "Hugh Selwyn Mauberley". In Demetres P. Tryphonopoulos and Stephen Adams (eds.) The Ezra Pound Encyclopedia. Westport, CT: Greenwood. 
 Albright, Daniel (2001) [1999]. "Early Cantos: I–XLI", in Ira Nadel (ed.). The Cambridge Companion to Ezra Pound. Cambridge: Cambridge University Press. 59–91. 
 Aldington, Richard (1941). Life for Life's Sake: A Book of Reminiscences. New York: The Viking Press. 
 Alexander, Michael (1979). The Poetic Achievement of Ezra Pound. Berkeley: University of California Press. 
 Alexander, Michael (1997). "Ezra Pound as Translator". Translation and Literature. 6(1), 23–30. 
 Arrowsmith, Rupert Richard (2011). Modernism and the Museum: Asian, African, and Pacific Art and the London Avant-Garde. Oxford: Oxford University Press. 
 Bacigalupo, Massimo (2001) [1999]. "Pound as Critic". In Ira Nadel (ed.). The Cambridge Companion to Ezra Pound. Cambridge: Cambridge University Press. 188–203. 
 Bacigalupo, Massimo (2020). Ezra Pound, Italy, and the Cantos. Clemson, SC: Clemson University Press. 
 Baker, Carlos (1981). Ernest Hemingway Selected Letters 1917–1961. New York: Charles Scribner's Sons. 
 
 Baumann, Walter (Fall & Winter 1983). "But to affirm the gold thread in the patten [116/797]: An examination of Canto 116". Paideuma: Modern and Contemporary Poetry and Poetics. 12(2/3), 199–221. 
 Baumann, Walter (Winter 1984). "Ezra Pound's Metamorphosis during his London Years: From Late-Romanticism to Modernism". Paideuma: Modern and Contemporary Poetry and Poetics. 13(3), 357–373. 
 Beach, Christopher (2003). The Cambridge Introduction to Twentieth-Century American Poetry. Cambridge: Cambridge University Press. 
 Beasley, Rebecca (2010). "Pound's New Criticism". Textual Practice. 24(4), 649–668. 
 Bishop, Elizabeth (Spring 1957). "Visits to St. Elizabeths". Partisan Review, 185–187. Also in Bishop, Elizabeth (1965). Questions of Travel. New York: Farrar, Straus and Giroux, 92–95. Courtesy link, Poetry Foundation.
 
 Bornstein, George (2001) [1999]. "Pound and the making of modernism". In Ira B. Nadel (ed.) The Cambridge Companion to Ezra Pound. Cambridge: Cambridge University Press, 22–42. 
 Bush, Ronald (1976). The Genesis of Ezra Pound's Cantos. Princeton, NJ: Princeton University Press.
 Carpenter, Humphrey (1988). A Serious Character: The Life of Ezra Pound. Boston: Houghton Mifflin. 
 Carswell, John (1978). Lives and Letters: A. R. Orage, Beatrice Hastings, Katherine Mansfield, John Middleton Murry, S. S. Koteliansky, 1906–1957. New York: New Directions Publishing. 
 Casillo, Robert (1988). The Genealogy of Demons: Anti-Semitism, Fascism, and the Myths of Ezra Pound. Evanston: Northwestern University Press. 
 Coats, Jason M. (Spring 2009). "'Part of the War Waste': Pound, Imagism, and Rhetorical Excess". Twentieth Century Literature. 55(1), 80–113. 
 Cohassey, John (2014). Hemingway and Pound: A Most Unlikely Friendship. Jefferson, NC: McFarland & Company. 
 Cockram, Patricia (2005). "Pound, Isabel Weston". In Demetres P. Tryphonopoulos and Stephen Adams (eds.) The Ezra Pound Encyclopedia. Westport, CT: Greenwood, 238–239. 
 Conover, Anne (2001). Olga Rudge and Ezra Pound: "What Thou Lovest Well ...". New Haven, CT: Yale University Press. 
 Conquest, Robert (1979). "Ezra Pound". In The Abomination of Moab. London: Temple Smith, 236–256. 
 Corrigan, Robert A. (October 1977). "Literature and Politics: The Case of Ezra Pound Reconsidered". Prospects, 2, 463–482. 
 
 Dennis, Helen May (2001) [1999]. "Pound, Women and Gender". In Ira Nadel (ed.) The Cambridge Companion to Ezra Pound. Cambridge: Cambridge University Press, 264–283. 
 
 Doolittle, Hilda (1979). End to Torment. New York: New Directions Publishing. 
 Doyle, Charles (2016) {1989]. Richard Aldington: A Biography. Basingstoke and London: Macmillan. 
 Eliot, T. S. (June 1915). "The Love Song of J. Alfred Prufrock". Poetry. VI(III), 130–135.
 Eliot, T. S. (September 1946). "Ezra Pound". Poetry. LXVIII(VI), 326–338.
 Erkkila, Betsy (ed.) (2011). Ezra Pound: The Contemporary Reviews. New York: Cambridge University Press. 
 Feldman, Matthew (Winter 2012). "The 'Pound Case' in Historical Perspective: An Archival Overview". Journal of Modern Literature. 35(2), 83–97. 
 Feldman, Matthew (2013). Ezra Pound's Fascist Propaganda, 1935–45. New York: Palgrave Macmillan. 
 Feldman, Matthew (2016). [2014]. "Pound and Radio Treason: An Empirical Reassessment". In Matthew Feldman, Henry Mead, Erik Tonning (eds.). Broadcasting in the Modernist Era. London and New York: Bloomsbury, 213–244. 
 Ford, Ford Madox (1931). Return to Yesterday: Reminiscences 1894–1914. London: Victor Gollancz Ltd.
 Gery, John (2005).  "Exultations". In Demetres P. Tryphonopoulos and Stephen Adams (eds.). The Ezra Pound Encyclopedia. Westport, CT: Greenwood, 114–115. 
 Gill, Jonathan P. (2005). "Ezra Pound Speaking: Radio Speeches on World War II". In Demetres P. Tryphonopoulos and Stephen Adams (eds.). The Ezra Pound Encyclopedia. Westport, CT: Greenwood, 115–116. 
 Gill, Jonathan P. (2005). "If This Be Treason ...". In Demetres P. Tryphonopoulos and Stephen Adams (eds.). The Ezra Pound Encyclopedia. Westport, CT: Greenwood, 155. 
 Graves, Robert (1 April 1955). "These Be Your Gods, O Israel!" Essays in Criticism. V(2), 129–150. 
 Hale, William Gardner (April 1919). "Pegasus Impounded". Poetry. XIV(I), 53–55.
 
 Haller, Evelyn (2005). "Mosley, Sir Oswald". In Demetres P. Tryphonopoulos and Stephen Adams (eds.) The Ezra Pound Encyclopedia. Westport, CT: Greenwood. 
 Hemingway, Ernest (Spring 1925). "Homage to Ezra". This Quarter. 1, 221–225.
 Hemingway, Ernest. Bruccoli, Matthew and Baughman, Judith (eds.) (2006). Hemingway and the Mechanism of Fame. Columbia, SC: University of South Carolina Press. 
 Hickman, Miranda B. (2005). The Geometry of Modernism: The Vorticist Idiom in Lewis, Pound, H.D., and Yeats. Austin, TX: University of Texas Press. 
 Hillyer, Robert (11 June 1949). "Treason's Strange Fruit: The Case of Ezra Pound and the Bollingen Award". The Saturday Review of Literature. xxxii/24, 9–11, 28.
 Hillyer, Robert (18 June 1949). "Poetry's New Priesthood". The Saturday Review of Literature, 7–9, 38.
 
 Holmes, Colin (2016) [1979]. Anti-Semitism in British Society, 1876–1939. Abingdon and New York: Routledge. 
 Houen, Alex (2010). "Antisemitism". In Ira B. Nadel (ed.). Ezra Pound in Context. New York: Cambridge University Press. 
 Huang, Michelle Ling-Ying (2015). "Chinese Artistic Influences on the Vorticists in London". In Anne Witchard (ed.). British Modernism and Chinoiserie. Edinburgh: Edinburgh University Press. 
 
 Ingham, Michael (2001) [1999]. "Pound and Music". In Ira Nadel (ed.). The Cambridge Companion to Ezra Pound. Cambridge: Cambridge University Press, 236–248. 
 Johnson, Edd (9 May 1945). "Confucius and Kindred Subjects/Pound, Accused of Treason, Calls Hitler, Saint, Martyr". Chicago Sun. Also in Philadelphia Record as "Poet-Prisoner Pound Calls Hitler Saint".
 Julius, Anthony (1997) [1995]. T. S. Eliot, anti-semitism, and literary form. Cambridge and New York: Cambridge University Press. 
 Karachalios, Evan R. (Spring 1995). "Sacrifice and Selectivity in Ezra Pound's First Canto". Paideuma: Modern and Contemporary Poetry and Poetics. 24(1), 95–106. 
 Kavka, Jerome (Spring & Fall 1991). "Ezra Pound's Personal History: A Transcript". Paideuma: Modern and Contemporary Poetry and Poetics. 20(1/2), 143–185. 
 Kearns, George (1989). Pound: The Cantos. Cambridge and New York: Cambridge University Press. 
 Kenner, Hugh. (Winter 1949). "Review: In the Caged Panther's Eyes". The Hudson Review. 1(4), 580–586. 
 Kenner, Hugh. (1951). The Poetry of Ezra Pound. London: Faber & Faber.
 Kenner, Hugh. (November 1952). "Gold in the Gloom". Poetry. 81(2), 127–132.
 Kenner, Hugh (1973) [1971]. The Pound Era. Berkeley and Los Angeles: University of California Press. 
 
 Kimpel, Ben D. and Eaves, T. C. Duncan (November 1981). "More on Pound's Prison Experience". American Literature. 53(1), 469–476. 
 Kimpel, Ben D. and Eaves, T. C. Duncan (March 1983). "Ezra Pound on Hitler's Economic Policies"]. American Literature. 55(1), 48–54. 
 Knapp, James F. (1979). Ezra Pound. Boston: Twayne Publishers. 
 
 Kutler, Stanley I. (1983). American Inquisition: Justice and Injustice in the Cold War. New York: Hill & Wang.
 Laughlin, James (Fall 1986). "Ez as Wuz". San José Studies. XII(3), 6–28.
 Leavis, F. R. (1942) (1932). New Bearings in English Poetry: A Study of the Contemporary Situation. London: Chatto & Windus.
 Lewis, Anthony (14 April 1958). "U.S. asked to end Pound indictment". The New York Times.
 Lewis, Wyndham (1931). Hitler. London: Chatto & Windus.
 Longenbach, James (10 January 1988). "The Odd Couple: Pound and Yeats Together". The New York Times.
 Longenbach, James (1990) [1988]. Stone Cottage: Pound, Yeats and Modernism. New York: Oxford University Press. 
 Lowell, Amy (1955). The Complete Poetical Works of Amy Lowell. Boston: Houghton Mifflin Company.
 Marsh, Alec (2011). Ezra Pound. London: Reaktion Books. 
 
 McDonald, Gail (2005). "Education: Personal". In Demetres P. Tryphonopoulos and Stephen Adams (eds.) The Ezra Pound Encyclopedia. Westport, CT: Greenwood, 90–92 
 McGuire, William (2020) [1982]. Bollingen: An Adventure in Collecting the Past. Princeton and Guilford: Princeton University Press. 
 
 Meyers, Jeffrey (1985). Hemingway: A Biography. New York: Macmillan. 
 Moody, A. David (2007). Ezra Pound: Poet. A Portrait of the Man and His Work. I: The Young Genius 1885–1920. Oxford: Oxford University Press. 
 Moody, A. David (2014). Ezra Pound: Poet. A Portrait of the Man and His Work. II: The Epic Years 1921–1939. Oxford: Oxford University Press.  
 Moody, A. David (2015). Ezra Pound: Poet. A Portrait of the Man and His Work. III: The Tragic Years 1939–1972. Oxford: Oxford University Press. 
 
 Nadel, Ira (2001) [1999]. "Introduction". In Ira Nadel (ed.). The Cambridge Companion to Ezra Pound. Cambridge: Cambridge University Press. 1–21. 
 Nadel, Ira (2005). "Introduction". In Ira Nadel (ed.). Ezra Pound. Early Writings: Poems and Prose. London: Penguin Books. 
 Nadel, Ira (2007). The Cambridge Introduction to Ezra Pound. New York: Cambridge University Press. 
 Nadel, Ira (2010). "The Lives of Pound". In Ira Nadel (ed.). Ezra Pound in Context. Cambridge: Cambridge University Press. 
 Nicholls, Peter (2001) [1999]. "Beyond The Cantos: Ezra Pound and recent American poetry". In Ira Nadel (ed.) The Cambridge Companion to Ezra Pound. Cambridge: Cambridge University Press. 139–160.
 Orage, A. R. as R.H.C. (31 January 1921). "Readers and Writers". The New Age. xxviii, 126–127.
 Olson, Charles (1991) [1975]. Charles Olson & Ezra Pound: An Encounter at St. Elizabeths. Edited by Catherine Seelye. New York: Paragon House. 
 
 Pound, Ezra (April 1909). Personae. London: Elkin Mathews.
 Pound, Ezra (1910). The Spirit of Romance. London: J. M. Dent & Sons.
 Pound, Ezra (1912). Ripostes. London: Stephen Swift & Co Ltd.
 Pound, Ezra (March 1913). "A Few Don'ts by an Imagiste". Poetry. I(6), 200–206.
 Pound, Ezra (April 1913). "In a Station of the Metro". Poetry. II(1), 40.
 Pound, Ezra (ed.) (1914). Des Imagistes. New York: Albert and Charles Boni.
 Pound, Ezra (June 1914). "Vortex". BLAST, edited by Wyndham Lewis, no. 1.
 Pound, Ezra (1915). Cathay. London: Elkin Mathews.
 Pound, Ezra (1916). Gaudier-Brzeska: A Memoir. London and New York: John Lane, The Bodley Head.
 Pound, Ezra (June 1917). "Three Cantos: I". Poetry. X(III), 113–121.
 Pound, Ezra (July 1917). "Three Cantos: II". Poetry. X(IV), 180–188.
 Pound, Ezra (August 1917)]. "Three Cantos: III". Poetry. X(V), 248–254.
 Pound, Ezra (1918). "A Retrospect". Pavannes and Divisions. New York: Alfred A. Knopf, 95–111.
 Pound, Ezra (1920). "Hugh Selwyn Mauberley". London: The Ovid Press.
 Pound, Ezra (1934). "Cavalcanti". Make It New. London: Faber & Faber, 345–407.
 Pound, Ezra (Jan–Mar 1947). "Canto LXXVI". The Sewanee Review. 55(1), 56–67. 
 Pound, Ezra (Summer Fall 1962). "Canto 116". Paris Review. 28, 14–16.
 Pound, Ezra (1970) [1967]. Pound/Joyce: The Letters of Ezra Pound to James Joyce. Edited by Forrest Read. New York: New Directions Publishing. 
 Pound, Ezra (1974) [June 1914]. "How I Began". In Grace Schulman (ed.). Ezra Pound: A Collection of Criticism. New York: McGraw-Hill Book Company, 23–26. 
 Pound, Ezra (1990) [1926]. Personae: The Shorter Poems of Ezra Pound. Revised edition. Edited by Lea Baechler and A. Walter Litz. New York: New Directions Publishing.
 Pound, Ezra (1996) [1970]. The Cantos of Ezra Pound. New York: New Directions Publishing. 
 Pound, Ezra (2003a). Poems and Translations. New York: Library of America. 
 Pound, Ezra (2003b) [1948]. The Pisan Cantos. Edited by Richard Sieburth. New York: New Directions Books. 
 Pound, Omar and Litz, A. Walton (1984). Ezra Pound and Dorothy Shakespear. Their Letters: 1909–1914. New York: New Directions Publishing. 
 Pound, Omar and Spoo, Robert (1999). Ezra and Dorothy Pound: Letters in Captivity, 1945–1946. Oxford: Oxford University Press. 
 Preda, Roxana (2005a). "Economics". In Demetres P. Tryphonopoulos and Stephen Adams (eds.). The Ezra Pound Encyclopedia. Westport, CT: Greenwood, 87–89. 
 Preda, Roxana (2005b).  "Economics: Usury". In Demetres P. Tryphonopoulos and Stephen Adams (eds.). The Ezra Pound Encyclopedia. Westport, CT: Greenwood, 89–90. 
 Punch magazine (January–June 1909). Volume 136. 
 Putnam, Samuel (1947). Paris Was Our Mistress: Memoirs of a Lost and Found Generation. New York: Viking Press. 
 Qian, Zhaoming (2000). "Pound and Chinese Art in the 'British Museum Era'". In Dennis, Helen M. (ed). Ezra Pound and Poetic Influence. The Official Proceedings of the 17th International Ezra Pound Conference. Amsterdam and Atlanta: Rodopi, pp. 100–113. 
 Reck, Michael (June 1968). "A Conversation between Ezra Pound and Allen Ginsberg". Evergreen Review. 12 (55): 27–29, 84.
 Reck, Michael (9 October 1986). "An Exchange on Ezra Pound". The New York Review of Books.
 Redman, Tim (1991). Ezra Pound and Italian Fascism. Cambridge: Cambridge University Press. 
 Redman, Tim (2001) [1999]. "Pound's politics and economics". In Ira Nadel (ed.). The Cambridge Companion to Ezra Pound. Cambridge: Cambridge University Press, 249–263. 
 Reynolds, Michael (2000) [1999]. Hemingway: The Final Years. New York: W. W. Norton & Company. 
 Ricks, Christopher (1988). T. S. Eliot and Prejudice. Berkeley and Los Angeles: University of California Press. 
 Rossi, Romolo (2008). "A Psychiatrist's Recollections of Ezra Pound". Quaderni di Palazzo Serra. 15, 144–149.
 Sarfatti, Michele (2006). The Jews in Mussolini's Italy: From Equality to Persecution. Madison, WI: The University of Wisconsin Press. 
 Sandburg, Carl (February 1916). "The Work of Ezra Pound". Poetry.
 Sieburth, Richard (August 1979). "Review: He Do the Enemy in Different Voices". Poetry. 134(5), 292–302. 
 Sieburth, Richard (2003). "Introduction". In Ezra Pound. The Pisan Cantos. New York: New Directions Books, ix–xliii. 
 Slatin, Myles (October 1955). "More by Ezra Pound". The Yale University Library Gazette. 30(2), 74–80. 
 Spoo, Robert (2005). "Cravens, Margaret (1881–1912)". In Demetres P. Tryphonopoulos and Stephen Adams (eds.). The Ezra Pound Encyclopedia. Westport, CT: Greenwood, 67. 
 Stein, Gertrude (1933). The Autobiography of Alice B. Toklas. New York: The Literary Guild. 
 Stoicheff, Peter (Spring 1986)."The Composition and Publication History of Ezra Pound's Drafts & Fragments"]. Twentieth Century Literature. 32(1), 78–94. 
 Stoicheff, Peter (1995). The Hall of Mirrors: Drafts & Fragments and the End of Ezra Pound's Cantos. Ann Arbor: The University of Michigan Press. 
 Stock, Noel (1970). The Life of Ezra Pound. New York: Pantheon Books. 
 Surette, Leon and Tryphonopoulos, Demetres (2005). "'With usura hath no man a house of good stone' (Pound, Canto 45): An Interview with Leon Surette". ESC: English Studies in Canada.
 Swift, Daniel (2017). The Bughouse: The Poetry, Politics, and Madness of Ezra Pound. New York: Farrar, Straus and Giroux. 
 Tate, Allen (1955). "Ezra Pound and the Bollingen Prize". In Allen Tate (ed.). The Man Of Letters In The Modern World. New York: Meridian Books, 264–267.
 Terrell, Carroll F. (1993) [1980–1984]. A Companion to The Cantos of Ezra Pound. Berkeley: University of California Press. 
 Thacker, Andrew (2018) [2010]. The Imagist Poets. Tavistock: Northcote House Publishers. 
 Torrey, Edwin Fuller (1992) [1984]. The Roots of Treason and the Secret of St. Elizabeths. Bethesda, MD: Lucas Books. 
 Tremblay, Tony (Fall & Winter 1998). "The Literary Occult in the Letters of Marshall McLuhan and Ezra Pound"]. Paideuma: Modern and Contemporary Poetry and Poetics. 27(2/3), 107–127. 
 
 Tryphonopoulous, Demetres and Dunton, Sara (2019). "To Translate or Not To Translate? Pound's Prosodic Provocations in Hugh Selwyn Mauberley". In Lynn Kozak, Miranda Hickman (eds.). The Classics in Modernist Translation. London and New York: Bloomsbury. 
 
 Tytell, John (1987). Ezra Pound: The Solitary Volcano. New York: Anchor Press/Doubleday. 
 
 Wallace, Emily Mitchell (2010). "America". In Ira B. Nadel (ed.). Ezra Pound in Context. New York: Cambridge University Press, 202–220. 
 Webb, Clive (2011). Rabble Rousers: The American Far Right in the Civil Rights Era. Athens: University of Georgia Press.
 Wilhelm, James J. (1985a). The American Roots of Ezra Pound. New York: Garland Publishing, 1985. 
 Wilhelm, James J. (1985b). "Pounds's four fascinating grandparents". Paideuma: Modern and Contemporary Poetry and Poetics. 14(2/3), Fall & Winter, 377–384. 
 Wilhelm, James J. (1990). Ezra Pound in London and Paris, 1908–1925. University Park, PA: Pennsylvania State University Press. 
 Wilhelm, James J. (1994). Ezra Pound: The Tragic Years 1925–1972. University Park, PA: Pennsylvania State University Press. 
 Wilson, Peter (2014) [1997]. A Preface to Ezra Pound. Abingdon and New York: Routledge. 
 Witemeyer, Hugh (1981) [1969]. The Poetry of Ezra Pound: Forms and Renewal 1908–1920. Berkeley: University of California Press. 
 Witemeyer, Hugh (2001) [1999]. "Early Poetry 1908–1920". In Ira Nadel (ed.). The Cambridge Companion to Ezra Pound. Cambridge: Cambridge University Press. 43–58. 
 Witemeyer, Hugh (2005a). "A Lume Spento". In Demetres P. Tryphonopoulos and Stephen Adams (eds.) The Ezra Pound Encyclopedia. Westport, CT: Greenwood, 185–186. 
 Witemeyer, Hugh (2005b). "A Quinzaine for This Yule". In Demetres P. Tryphonopoulos and Stephen Adams (eds.) The Ezra Pound Encyclopedia. Westport, CT: Greenwood, 249. 
 Yao, Steven G. (2010). "Translation", Ira B. Nadel (ed.) in Ezra Pound in Context. New York: Cambridge University Press.

Further reading

Articles

 Caldwell, Christopher (15 March 1999). "The Poet as Con Artist". The Weekly Standard.
 Campbell, James (17 May 2008). "Home from home". The Guardian.
 Ellison, Michael (27 October 1999). "Jew-hating Ezra Pound barred from poets' corner". The Guardian.
 Feldman, Matthew (2009). "Make It Crude: Ezra Pound's Antisemitic Propaganda for the BUF and PNF".  Holocaust Studies. 15(1–2), 59–77. 
 
 
 
 Mertens, Richard (April 2001). "Letter by letter". University of Chicago Magazine.
 Ormsby, Eric (7 July 2017). "Bedlam salon". Times Literary Supplement.
 Orwell, George (May 1949). "The Question of the Pound Award". The Partisan Review, 517.
 Also in Sonia Orwell and Ian Angus, Ian (eds.). (1968). George Orwell: In Front of Your Nose: 1945–1950. Volume IV. New York: Harcourt Brace Jovanovich, Inc., 490–491. 
 Sokol, B. J. (December 1976). "What Went Wrong between Robert Frost and Ezra Pound". The New England Quarterly. 49(4), 521–541. 
 Wertham, Fredric (Winter 2000) [1949]. "The Road to Rapallo: A Psychiatric Study". American Journal of Psychotherapy. 54(1), 102–115.
 Wheatley, David (13 May 2006). "The vain theories of a village explainer". The Irish Times.

Audio and video
 Ezra Pound recordings. PennSound. University of Pennsylvania.
 "The Four Steps" (recording of Pound). BBC Home Service, 21 June 1958.
 Hammer, Langdon (February 2007). Lecture on Ezra Pound. Yale University.
 Sieburth, Richard (15 March 2013). "The Voice in the Age of Mechanical Reproduction" (discusses recordings of Pound). Woodberry Poetry Room. Harvard University.

Books

 
 Desai, Meghnad (2006). The Route of All Evil: The Political Economy of Ezra Pound. London: Faber & Faber. 
 Eliot, T. S. (1917). Ezra Pound: His Metric and his Poetry. New York: Alfred A. Knopf. 
 McDiarmid, Lucy (2014). Poets & the Peacock Dinner: The Literary History of a Meal. Oxford: Oxford University Press. 
 Russell, Peter (ed.) (1950). An Examination of Ezra Pound. New York: New Directions (essays by Eliot, Sitwell, Tate, Hemingway, and others).
 Surette, Leon (1999). Pound in Purgatory: From Economic Radicalism to Anti-Semitism. Urbana, IL: University of Illinois Press. 
 Witemeyer, Hugh (ed.) (1996). Pound/Williams: Selected letters of Ezra Pound and William Carlos Williams. New York: New Directions.

External links

 The Ezra Pound Society
 
 
 
 
 
 Ezra Pound papers; photographs; and William Bird Ezra Pound papers. Beinecke Rare Book and Manuscript Library. Yale University.
 "Selected World War II Broadcasts". University of Illinois at Urbana-Champaign.
 "Ezra Pound collection". Simon Fraser University.
 "Ezra Pound collection, 1911–1920". Emory University.
 Ezra Pound papers, 1915–1959. Columbia University Libraries.
 "Ezra Pound". Federal Bureau of Investigation.
 "Frequently requested records: Ezra Pound". United States Department of Justice.
 Archives of the New Age.

 
1885 births
1972 deaths
20th-century American essayists
20th-century American male musicians
20th-century American male writers
20th-century American poets
20th-century translators
American anti-capitalists
American anti-communists
American art critics
American art historians
American classical composers
American collaborators with Fascist Italy
American collaborators with Nazi Germany
American conspiracy theorists
American expatriates in England
American expatriates in France
American expatriates in Italy
American fascists
American historians
American literary critics
American magazine editors
American male classical composers
American male essayists
American male non-fiction writers
American modernist poets
American opera composers
American pamphleteers
American people of English descent
American prisoners and detainees
American sinologists
American social crediters
American translators
American white supremacists
Anti-Masonry
Antisemitism in Italy
Bollingen Prize recipients
Burials at Isola di San Michele
Chinese–English translators
Deaths from bowel obstruction
English-language poets
Epic poets
Fascist writers
Hamilton College (New York) alumni
Historians of philosophy
Imagists
Literary theorists
Lost Generation writers
Male opera composers
Nazi propagandists
People declared mentally unfit for court
People from Cheltenham, Pennsylvania
People from Felpham
People from Hailey, Idaho
People of the Italian Social Republic
People with bipolar disorder
People with narcissistic personality disorder
Philosophers of art
Philosophers of economics
Philosophers of history
Philosophers of language
Philosophers of social science
Political philosophers
Prisoners and detainees of the United States federal government
Prisoners and detainees of the United States military
Social philosophers
Theorists on Western civilization
Translators to English
University of Pennsylvania alumni
Vorticists
Wabash College faculty
Wadsworth family
Writers about activism and social change
Writers from Idaho
People from Idaho
Writers from Philadelphia
Members of the American Academy of Arts and Letters